This is a list of Officer of the Order of the British Empire (OBE) awards in the 1919 Birthday Honours.

The 1919 Birthday Honours were appointments by King George V to various orders and honours to reward and highlight good works by citizens of the British Empire. The appointments were made to celebrate the official birthday of The King, and were published in The London Gazette from 3 June to 12 August. The vast majority of the awards were related to the recently ended War, and were divided by military campaigns. A supplementary list of honours, retroactive to the King's birthday, was released in December 1919.

Officer of the Order of the British Empire (OBE) awards

Military Division

For valuable services rendered in connection with military operations in the Aden Peninsula
Maj. Ian Macpherson Macrae  Indian Medical Service
Capt. Gerald Gozens Pullman, 6th Battalion East Surrey Regiment 
Mabel Anna Stroughill  Senior Nursing Sister, Queen Alexandra's Imperial Military Nursing Service

For services rendered in connection with military operations in the Balkans
Temp Capt. Albert Roland Anderson, Royal Army Service Corps
Temp Maj. George Denholm Armour, Army Remount Service
Capt. William Arnot, Cameron Highlanders
Maj. Cecil Charles Gough Ashton, East Surrey Regiment
Temp Capt. Wesley Barritt
Capt. Thomas Clement Erskine Barstow, 27th Gurkha Rifles, Indian Army
Temp Maj. Bertram Claude Barton, Royal Army Service Corps
Capt. and Bt. Maj. Frank William Beall, Royal Army Service Corps
Maj. William Henry Bingham, 1/69th Battalion Punjabis, Indian Army
Temp Maj. Reginald George Breadmore, Royal Army Service Corps
Rev. Eric Hugh Brereton, Royal Army Chaplains' Department
Temp Maj. Norman Howarth Brierley, Royal Engineers
Temp Maj. William Brock, Devonshire Regiment
Temp Capt. Albert James Studd Brown, Royal Fusiliers
Temp Capt. Reginald William Burn, Royal Army Service Corps
Capt. Arthur Bernard Butterworth, Royal Army Service Corps
Capt. and Bt. Maj. David Bannerman Burt-Marshall  Seaforth Highlanders
Maj. Donald Cunninghame Cameron, Royal Army Service Corps
Capt. Malcolm Hay Alexander Campbell, 1/8 Punjabis, Indian Army
Lt. John MacKnight Campbell  Royal Scots
Capt. Arthur Skedling Cane  Royal Army Medical Corps
Capt. and Bt. Maj. Charles Alexander Cardwell, Oxfordshire and Buckinghamshire Light Infantry
Temp Maj. and Bt. Lt.-Col. Hon Dudley Massey Pigott Carleton
Temp Maj. Leonard James Castle  Duke of Cornwall's Light Infantry
Rev. Frank Hanson Chambers, Royal Army Chaplains' Department
Temp Maj. Francis Jervoise Collas  Royal Jersey Artillery
Maj. Harry Rollo Crailsham, Scottish Rifles
Temp Capt. Thomas Daily Cumberland  Royal Army Medical Corps
Temp Maj. John Ernest Moncrieff Cuthbertson, Royal Army Service Corps
Doctor Elsie Jean Dalyell, Royal Army Medical Corps
Temp Capt. Alexander White Darby, Labour Corps
Rev. David Davies, Royal Army Chaplains' Department
Capt. Archibald Sholto George Douglas, Rifle Brigade
Temp Maj. Harry Melville Edwards, Worcestershire Regiment
Capt. Hector Charles Ellis, Middlesex Regiment
Temp Maj. Philip Remington England, Royal Army Service Corps
Capt. Harold Arthur Thomas Fairbank  Royal Army Medical Corps
Rev. Fergus Ferguson, Royal Army Chaplains' Department
Capt. Cuthbert Edmund Caulfield Ferry, Royal Army Medical Corps
Temp Maj. Phillip Henry Fish, Royal Army Service Corps
Quartermaster and Lt.-Col. James Joseph Fox, Royal Irish Regiment
Capt. Walter Longueville Giffard, Leicestershire Regiment
Temp Capt. George Godwin, Labour Corps
Quartermaster and Temp Capt. George Goodwin, Royal Engineers
Temp Maj. William Richard Gosling, Welsh Regiment
Temp Maj. Arthur Trevor Gough  Royal Field Artillery
Capt. Francis George Hearne, Royal Army Service Corps
Capt. Thomas Shirley Hele, Royal Army Medical Corps
Lt. John Gilbert Henderson  Royal Engineers
Temp Capt. Walter Heurtley
Maj. Alfred Siegfried Holme, Royal Engineers
Capt. Thomas George Holland, Labour Corps, Indian Army
Capt. Frank Hopkin, Royal Army Veterinary Corps
Capt. William Herbert Gascoigne Horn, Royal Army Service Corps
Capt. and Bt. Maj. James Nockells Horlick  Coldstream Guards
Capt. Robert Hugh Holmes Jackson, East Surrey Regiment
Lt..Col. Herbert Ellison Rhodes James  Royal Army Medical Corps
Capt. Aaron Jameson, East Yorkshire Regiment
Temp Capt. Alexander Harvey Morro Jamieson, Royal Garrison Artillery
Temp Lt. Thomas Stanley Wiles Jarvis  Manchester Regiment
Temp Capt. John Arnold Jones, Royal Army Medical Corps
Maj. Alexander Edward Kidd, Royal Army Medical Corps
Temp Lt.-Col. Lewis Hawker Kirkness  
Quartermaster and Capt. Alfred John Hammond Knight, Royal Army Medical Corps
Quartermaster and Capt. Albert Ernest Langley, Royal Army Service Corps
Temp Capt. Nigel Clere Leatham, Royal Army Service Corps
Doctor Elizabeth Herdman Lepper, Royal Army Medical Corps
Capt. Leslie Jabez Lightfoot, Army Pay Department
Capt. Charles Alfred Lucas, Royal Army Service Corps
Temp Capt. John Alfred Lucie-Smith
Temp Capt. Sidney Ivor Luck, Royal Engineers
Capt. Arthur Nevin Lyle, Royal Engineers
Rev. Charles Henry Preston Lyndon, Royal Army Chaplains' Department
Capt. Alieter Maxwell MacDonnell, Royal Army Service Corps
Capt. James St. Cuthbert MacGregor, Royal Field Artillery
Temp Maj. Ronald Charles MacNab, Royal Army Ordnance Corps
Temp Capt. Loudon Hope MacQueen, Royal Army Veterinary Corps
Temp Capt. Arthur Lambert Marlow, Labour Corps
Capt. Ian McLeod Angus Matheson, Lothians and Border Horse
Capt. Henry Maurice Michie, Scottish Horse
Rev. John Lloyd Milne, Royal Army Chaplains' Department
Maj. George Philip Morris, 30th Lancers, Indian Army
Temp Capt. John Norman Morrison, Army Rean. Service
Rev. James Reginald de Courcy O'Grady Murley, Royal Army Chaplains' Department
Temp Capt. Ryder Percival Nash, Royal Army Medical Corps
Capt. George William Nasmith, Manchester Regiment
Capt. Joseph Neill, Royal Garrison Artillery
Temp Capt. Frank Newey, Royal Army Medical Corps
Rev. Thomas Francis O'Brien, Royal Army Chaplains' Department
Maj. Henry Clement Pauncefort-Munday, Rifle Brigade
Capt. Ernest Snowden Wallace Peatt, Royal Army Veterinary Corps
Capt. Richard Hugh Penhale, Royal Army Veterinary Corps
Temp Maj. Richard Graham Pritchard, Royal Engineers
Temp Lt. John Ranisboittom  
Temp Quartermaster and Capt. Frederick Richardson, Royal Army Medical Corps
Temp Maj. Cyril Ellett Robinson, Royal Garrison Artillery
Capt. Reginald Stanley Ronald, Royal Army Service Corps
Temp Capt. John Wentworth Rooke, Royal Wiltshire Yeomanry
Capt. Harry Roscoe, Royal Garrison Artillery
Temp Capt. John Allan Rule, Devonshire Regiment
Temp Capt. John Augustus Saunders, Royal Army Service Corps
Rev. Harold Gordon Sellers, Royal Army Chaplains' Department
Temp Maj. Harry Alexander Smythe, Royal Army Service Corps
Maj. Thomas South, Middlesex Regiment
Temp Maj. John Edward Spurway, Royal Army Service Corps
Capt. and Bt. Maj. Stanley Stericker, Scottish Horse Yeomanry
Maj. and Bt. Lt.-Col. Claude Bayfield Stokes  Indian Army
Temp Capt. Leslie Eric Sheldon Stokes, Royal Field Artillery
Temp Capt. James Robert Stott, Royal Army Medical Corps
Temp Capt. Herbert Marmaduke Joseph Stourton
Temp Capt. Basil Wilford Taylor, Royal Artillery
Lt. Olive Errington Temperley  Rifle Brigade
Maj. John Pickering Thompson, 25th Scinde Horse, Indian Army
Temp Capt. Maurice Scott Thompson
Capt. Percival Walter Thorogood, London Regiment
Capt. Peter Ralph Alwen Thrale, Royal Army Veterinary Corps
Capt. and Bt. Maj. Edmund Samuel Waite Tidswell  Leicestershire Regiment
Capt. Eustace Mandeville Wetenhall Tillyard, Royal Lancaster Regiment
Temp Maj. Wilfred Irwin Travers, Royal Engineers
Capt. and Bt. Maj. Claude Lechmere St. John Tudor  Royal Army Service Corps
Capt. Frank Forbes Tweedie, Royal Engineers
Capt. Reginald Martin Vick, Royal Army Medical Corps
Temp Lt.-Col. Henry Clifford Wallis, Royal Army Service Corps
Temp Capt. James Warnock, Royal Army Medical Corps
Temp Maj. Arthur Warren-Lambert, Royal Army Service Corps
Capt. Roger John Watts, Worcestershire Yeomanry
Temp Capt. Charles Henry White, Royal Army Service Corps
Lt.-Col. Henry Wilson, Royal Army Service Corps
Temp Maj. Harold Waterlow Wiltshire  Royal Army Medical Corps
Capt. Lionel Dudley Woods, Royal Army Medical Corps
Temp Capt. Walter Edward Wort, Royal Army Ordnance Corps
Temp Maj. James Wright, Royal Engineers
Temp Capt. Frederick Hugh Royal Army Medical Corps
Temp Capt. William Alexander Young, Royal Engineers

Canadian Forces
Maj. Harold Kenzie Newcombe, Manitoba Regiment

South African Overseas Forces
Temp Capt. Herbert Glyn Chevens, SA Defence Force

For valuable services rendered in connection with military operations in East Africa
Temp Capt. Neale Andrews, Royal Army Service Corps
Capt. Herbert Benjamin Atkinson, East African Forces
Capt. William Chalmers, Royal Army Ordnance Corps, King's African Rifles, East African Forces
Capt. Percival Lorimer Collision
Temp Capt. Arthur Paul Dashwood, Royal Engineers
Capt. Herbert Lyndhurst Duke, Uganda M.S
Capt. Robert Bleeck Leech Harvey, Royal Berkshire Regiment, attd. King's African Rifles
Capt. Sydney Joseph Verner Furlong  Royal Army Medical Corps
Maj. John Lawton Hardy, Labour Corps, East African Forces
Capt. Henry Albert Gravious Jeffreys, Army Pay Corps, East African Forces
Temp Capt. Percy John Jennings, Royal Engineers
Maj. Thomas William. Hathway Jones, Indian Army
Capt. James Dunlop Kidd  Royal Army Medical Corps
Capt. Ernest Harry Thorn Lawrence, Connaught Rangers
Maj. John Douglas Leonard  labour Corps, East African Forces
Capt. Frederick Herbert James Marshall, Rifle Brigade
Temp Maj. James Thomas Montgomery, Nyasaland Field Force
Temp Capt. Leslie Mortimer, Royal Army Service Corps
Temp Maj. Charles Ernest Muggeridge 
Rev Walter Sutton Page  Royal Army Chaplains' Department
Capt. Edward Henry Banks Palmer, East African Forces
Lt. Arthur Charles Cosmo Parkinson, attd. East African Rifles
Capt. John Paterson, Labour Corps, East African Forces
Rev Peter Rogan, Royal Army Chaplains' Department
Maj. Alexander Russell  labour Corps, East African Forces
Temp Maj. Bernard William Shilson, Royal Army Service Corps
Temp Capt. Geoffrey Lionel Smith, King's African Rifles 
Capt. Harold Josiah Solomon  Royal Army Service Corps
Capt. Andrew McCrae Watson, East African Forces
Maj. Charles Scott Moncreiff Chalmers Watson  Royal Engineers
Capt. Arthur Cecil Whitehorne, Welsh Regiment, attd. King's African Rifles
Temp Maj. Arthur Donald John Bedwood Williams, attd. East African Forces
Temp Capt. Arthur Charles Willmot, King's African Rifles
Temp Capt. William James Primet Woakes, Royal Army Service Corps

South African Forces
Maj. James Cecil Bateman, SA Pay Corps
Capt. Rudolph John Bell  SA Service Corps
Temp Maj. Bernard Heatherington Bromilow, SA Service Corps
Maj. Robert Murray Dunbar  SA Service Corps
Maj. William Vincent Field, SA Medical Corps
Temp Lt.-Col. Jack Grinsell, SA Medical Corps
Lt.-Col. Earnest Whitmore Newton Guinness, Railway Corps, SA Force
Capt. Henry Epton Hornby, SA Veterinary Corps
Temp Capt. Courteney Charles Hosken, SA Service Corps
Capt. George Ronald, SA Service Corps
Maj. George James Tharton Thornton, Rhodesia Native Regiment

For valuable service rendered in connection with military operations in France
Temp Lt. Edwin Plimpton Adams, Royal Engineers
Temp Lt. Thomas Henry Adams, Royal Engineers
Temp Capt. Sidney Alban-Uff, Royal Army Service Corps
Maj. Evelyn Aldridge, Royal Garrison Artillery
Temp Capt. Philip George Alexandra, Yorkshire Regiment
Lt. Sidney Ernest Alford  Royal Field Artillery
Capt. Richard Ley Allan, East Lancashire Regiment, attd. Royal Engineers
Temp Capt. Philip Allard, Royal Marine Light Infantry
Maj. Bryce Allan, Royal Garrison Artillery
Temp Capt. Francis John Allen  Royal Army Medical Corps
Temp Capt. Frederick John Allen, Royal Army Service Corps
Temp Capt. Francis Henry Middleton Anderson, Royal Army Service Corps
Maj. James Douglas Anderson, Royal Garrison Artillery
Capt. Neil Gordon Anderson, Royal Army Service Corps
Maj. Robert Gray Anderson, Royal Army Veterinary Corps
Temp Capt. Thomas Andrew Irving Anderson, Royal Army Veterinary Corps
Temp Capt. William Anderson  Royal Army Medical Corps
Capt. Wilfred Arthur Duncombe Anderson, Labour Corps
Capt. and Bt. Maj. George Lionel Andrew
Temp Capt. William Brodie Gurney Angus  Royal Army Medical Corps
Temp Capt. Alexander Frederick Aris, Royal Army Service Corps
Capt. Samuel Richard Armstrong, Royal Army Medical Corps
Temp Lt.-Col. Godfrey George Armstrong  
Capt. Sereld John Armstrong  Royal Engineers
Temp 2nd Lt. Ernest Ash, Labour Corps
Quartermaster and Capt. Frederick Henry Ashford, Royal Engineers
Temp Capt. Reginald Guy Attwood, Royal Engineers
Temp Lt. Cyril William Bacon, Royal Army Ordnance Corps
Maj. William Merciless Baird, Argyll and Sutherland Highlanders
Temp Capt. Arthur Frederick Baker, Royal Army Service Corps
Temp Maj. Herbert Baker, Royal Army Service Corps
Lt. Joseph Samuel Baker, Leinster Regiment
Maj. Dudley Vere Morley Balders  Suffolk Regiment
Temp Capt. Harry Standish Ball, Royal Engineers
Temp Lt. Gilbert Alfred Ballard, Royal Engineers
Rev. Austen Humphrey Balleine, Royal Army Chaplains' Department
Capt. Hugh Scott Barrett, Liverpool Regiment
Lt.-Col. Cyril Alexander Barron, Royal Army Service Corps
Temp Capt. John Hewitt Barry, Royal Army Service Corps
Temp Capt. Oharles Percival Barton, Royal Army Service Corps
Temp Capt. Ernest Francis Bashford, Royal Army Medical Corps
Temp Capt. Arthur Batchelor, Royal Army Service Corps
Capt. Hubert Tunstall Bates, Royal Army Medical Corps
Lt. Herbert Mackenzie Batson, Devonshire Regiment, attd. Labour Corps
Capt. Edgar Douglas Batty
Temp Capt. Frederick Henry Bawden, Labour Corps
Temp Capt. Arthur Baxter, Royal Army Service Corps
Capt. David Charles Baxter, Royal Army Medical Corps
Capt. Henry Cuthbert Bazett  Royal Army Medical Corps
Temp Quartermaster and Capt. Sydney Thomas Beard, Royal Army Medical Corps
Temp Maj. William John Beatty, Royal Army Service Corps
Quartermaster and Maj. Henry George Beaumont, Royal Army Service Corps
Temp Lt. Philip Ernest Beavis, Royal Artillery
Capt. Roland Harry Bebb
Temp Capt. Charles Stephenscn Beckett
Temp Capt. Thomas Cannichael Bell
Capt. William Lloyd Bemrose, Nottinghamshire and Derbyshire Regiment
Capt. Bernard John Taylor Bennette
Capt. and Bt. Maj. Norman Carmichael Bennett  Argyll and Sutherland Highlanders
Quartermaster and Capt. Thomas William Bennett, Border Regiment
Lt.-Col. William Bennett  Royal Army Medical Corps
Lt. Hugh Benson, Royal Field Artillery
Temp Maj. George Augustus Benson  Royal Army Medical Corps
Temp Capt. Gerald Waddington Beresford, Royal Army Medical Corps
Temp Lt. Oliver Percy Bernard  Royal Engineers
Capt. Winslow Seymour Sterling Berry, Royal Army Medical Corps
Temp Capt. Sigismund Payne Best
Lt. Calverly Bewicke  Scots Guards
Lt. Alfred James Biddulph  Royal Field Artillery
Capt. William Charles Bigg, Royal Army Service Corps
Temp Capt. Montague Birch, Royal Army Service Corps
Temp Lt. William Kenning Birch
Capt. Ronald Trevor Wilberforce Bird
Temp Maj. Lionel Oddy Gaskell Blackburn, Royal Army Service Corps
Capt. and Bt. Maj. Harold Henry Blake, Royal Army Medical Corps
Maj. William Lascelles Fitzgerald Blake, Royal Fusiliers
Temp Capt. William Edward Bliss, Royal Army Service Corps
Maj. Gerald Charles Gordon Blunt  Royal Army Service Corps
Quartermaster and Maj. Henry Boag, Dragoon Guards
Capt. Arthur Beaumont Boggs, 29th Lancers, Indian Army
Mildred Mary Bond  Acting Principal Matron, Queen Alexandra's Imperial Military Nursing Service
Temp Maj. William Cotsworth Bond, Labour Corps
Temp Maj. John Edward Bostock, Royal Engineers
Capt. Thomas Herbert Geoffrey Bostock, London Yeomanry
Temp Capt. Laurence Owen Bosworth  
Lt. Thomas Richard Arterr Bourne, Royal Army Service Corps
Lt. Norman James Bowater, Royal Army Service Corps
Capt. Lancelot Tregonwell Syndercombe Bower, Dorsetshire Regiment
Capt. Alfred Benjaminr Bowhay, Royal Army Veterinary Corps
Capt. George Edward Bowman, Machine Gun Corps
Temp Capt. William Everett Bownass  Royal Field Artillery
Lt. Edward Valentine Bowra, Royal Engineers
Temp Lt. Henry Bowron, Royal Army Service Corps
Temp Capt. Herbert Augustus Boys, Royal Army Service Corps
Temp Capt. William Allan Bradley  Durham Light Infantry
Capt. and Bt. Maj. Eustace Arthur Braya  East Yorkshire Regiment
Quartermaster and Capt. William Brennan, Royal Army Medical Corps
Lt. Harry Brewin, Royal Field Artillery
Temp Capt. Albert Victor Brice, Royal Engineers
Maj. Eustace Carlile Brierley  Lancashire Fusiliers
Capt. and Bt. Maj. Henry StackpooIe Briggs, Royal Engineers
Temp Capt. Waldo Raven Briggs
Lt.-Col. Eustace Webster Brightman, Royal Army Service Corps
Temp Maj. Richard Bower Bristed, Royal Engineers
Temp Capt. Joseph Fane Brieter, Manchester Regiment
Lt. Hugh Richard Broimley-Davenport
Temp Capt. Lennox Ross Broster  Royal Army Medical Corps
Temp Lt. Alwin Brown, Royal Army Ordnance Corps
Capt. Geoffrey Mainwaring Brown
Maj. Henry Brown, Royal Engineers
Rev. William Joseph Brown, Royal Army Chaplains' Department
Rev. Hugh Brown, Royal Army Chaplains' Department
Capt. Cyril Edward Browne  Royal Army Service Corps
Capt. John Bruce, Royal Army Medical Corps
Temp Lt. Guy Brunton, Labour Corps
Temp Capt. Francis Bryce, King's Royal Rifle Corps
Temp Capt. Maurice Bryans, Royal Army Service Corps
Maj. Arthur Louis Hamilton Buchanan, Gordon Highlanders
Temp Capt. Leslie Binmore Burlace, Royal Army Service Corps
Lt. James Melvill Burchell, London Regiment
Lt. Leonard Burland, Labour Corps
Lt. Cuthbert Burn-Callender, Montgomeryshire  Yeomanry
Temp Capt. Edgar Bryan Burstali, Royal Army Service Corps
Temp Lt.-Col. Henry Walter Burton, Royal Engineers
Temp Capt. Frederick William Butler, Royal Army Service Corps
Capt. James Ramsay Montagu Butler, Scottish Horse Yeomanry
Maj. Gerald Bertram Byrne, Rifle Brigade
Temp Lt. John Cameron, Royal Engineers
Temp Capt. Duncan Campbell, Royal Army Veterinary Corps
Capt. Francis Ernest Archer Campbell
Temp Capt. Lewis Gordon Campbell
Temp Lt. Thomas Campbell, Royal Engineers
Lt. William Little Campbell, Royal Irish Regiment
Temp Lt. Ernest Reginald Canharn, Royal Engineers
Temp Capt. William Butler Cannon, Royal Army Service Corps
Capt. James Edward Hamilton Carkett  Duke of Cornwall's Light Infantry
Maj. James Charles Gordon Carmichael, Royal Army Medical Corps
Temp Lt. James Duncan Carmichael, Royal Engineers
Capt. Noel Lewis Carringtton, Wiltshire Regiment
Capt. William Carrington, King's Own Yorkshire Light Infantry
Capt. Francis Carruthers, East Yorkshire Regiment
Maj. Albert Joseph Henry Carstairs, Royal Irish Rifles
Temp Capt. Ernest Walker Augustus Carter, Royal Engineers
Temp Maj. Gerald Francis Carter
Maj. Thomas Moravian Carter, Royal Army Medical Corps
Temp Quartermaster and Capt. Arthur Case, South Wales Borderers
Temp Lt. Anthony Aloysius Cassera, Royal Engineers
Temp Capt. Henry James Cavanagh, Royal Army Service Corps
Maj. Percy Cazenove, Hertfordshire Yeomanry
Temp Capt. Alan Wentworth Chadwick, Hampshire Regiment
Temp Lt. Sydney Arthur Chambers, Royal Engineers
Temp Maj. Charles Leonard Chapman, Royal Marine Light Infantry
Temp Lt. Leslie William Charley
Lt. Richard Charnock  Liverpool Regiment
Rev. William Cramb Charteris  Royal Army Chaplains' Department
Maj. Ralph Diarley Cheales
Capt. William George Lloyd Cheriton, Hampshire Regiment
Lt.-Col. Henry Robert Stark Christie  Royal Engineers
Temp Capt. Lionel Ronald Christie
Temp Maj. Herbert James Clark, Royal Army Service Corps
Temp Lt. Hugh Bryan Clark  Royal Army Service Corps
Capt. Charles Hugh Clarke, Lancashire Regiment
Capt. and Bt. Maj. Gerald Clarke, Nottinghamshire and Derbyshire Regiment
Quartermaster and Capt. Joseph Edward Clarke, Royal Sussex Regiment
Maj. Richard C. Clarke, Royal Army Medical Corps
Temp Capt. Frank Septimus Clay, Royal Army Veterinary Corps
Maj. George Frederick Lancelot Clayton-East, Royal Garrison Artillery
Temp Maj. Charles Edward Cleeve, Royal Army Service Corps
Capt. Arthur Cliff, Worcestershire Regiment
Temp Capt. Herbert Cunningham Clogstoun  labour Corps
Lt.-Col. Francis Morton Close, Royal Engineers
Temp Lt. Noel Stewart Clouston, Royal Engineers
Ethel Robin Clowes  Unit Administrator, Queen Mary's Army Auxiliary Corps
Temp Capt. Herbert Wallis Coales  Royal Engineers
Capt. Edward Clive Coates, 15th Hussars
Temp Lt. Joseph Michael Smith Coates, Machine Gun Corps
Maj. Geoffrey Ronald Codrington  Leicestershire Yeomanry
Temp Lt. Daniel Coghlan, Lab. Corps
Maj. John Maurice Colchester-Wemyss, Royal Scots
Temp Maj. Harold Linter Cole, Royal Engineers
Lt.-Col. Henry Walter George Cole  Indian Army
Temp Capt. William Douglas Colin-York, Tank Corps
Capt. William Harold Colley, Yorkshire Regiment
Lt. Victor Alexander Colquhoom, Royal Field Artillery
Maj. Charles Rowe Colvile, King's Royal Rifle Corps
Temp Capt. Claude Gray Colyer, Royal Army Medical Corps
Capt. Clifford Edward Constable  King Edward's Horse
Temp Capt. Victor Chandler Cook, Royal Army Service Corps
Temp Maj. William Ernest Cook, Royal Marines
Lt.-Col. and Hon Col. James Cook, T.F. Res.
Temp Capt. Philip Andrew Cooks 
Temp Capt. Frederick Middleton Coombs, Royal Army Veterinary Corps
Lt. Harold Octavius Cooper, Royal Field Artillery
Maj. Daniel Maurice Corbett  Royal Army Medical Corps
Mary Cecilia Corbishley  Sister-in-Charge, Queen Alexandra's Imperial Military Nursing Service
Maj. Frederick Alleyne Corfield  Royal Army Service Corps
Maj. Reginald Philip Cork, Machine Gun Corps
Temp Capt. Robert Kenricky Cornish-Bowden, Royal Engineers
Lt. George Edward Corrall, Royal Fusiliers
Temp Capt. Peter James Cottle  Royal Engineers
Temp Capt. Robert William Cousins, Royal Army Service Corps
Capt. Thomas Coulson
Lt.-Col. Percy Alexander Cox, Labour Corps
Maj. Reginald Woodruff Cox, London Regiment
Temp Capt. Frederick Coy, Labour Corps
Temp and Hon Maj. Ernest Granville Crabtree, Royal Army Medical Corps
Temp Capt. John Gibson Craig, Royal Army Medical Corps
Capt. Norman Craig  Royal Army Service Corps
Capt. Thomas Craig, Royal Army Veterinary Corps
Maj. John Martim Maynard Crawford, Royal Army Medical Corps
Temp Quartermaster and Capt. Frank Crewe, South Staffordshire Regiment
Capt. Leonard Marshall Crockett
Lt. Reginald Douglas Crosby  Lincolnshire Regiment
Lt. Arthur Tonley Crosthwaite, Royal Army Service Corps
Temp Lt. Joseph John Crowe, Royal Engineers
Temp Capt. Robert Scott Cruickshank, Royal Army Service Corps
Rev. William Walker Cruickshank, Royal Army Chaplains' Department
Temp Maj. Edward Harold Crump, Royal Engineers
Lt. Philip Edwin Cuckow, Nottinghamshire and Derbyshire Regiment
Capt. Barry Stephenson Cumberlege, Royal Army Service Corps
Rev. Canon Bertram Keir Cunningham, Royal Army Chaplains' Department
Maj. John Francis Cunningham, Royal Army Medical Corps
Lt. Stanley Cursiter, Scottish Rifles
Capt. Cecil Montagu Drury Curtis, South Wales Borderers
Quartermaster and Capt. Frank Cutting, Royal Engineers
Temp Capt. Reginald Thornton Dadson, Labour Corps
Capt. John Dale, Royal Army Medical Corps
Capt. William Brown Dalgleish
Temp Maj. Lindsay Sydney Daniels, Royal Engineers
Lt. Charles Malcolm Davenport, Royal Field Artillery
Temp Capt. Hugh Stevenson Davidson  Royal Army Medical Corps
Temp Capt. James MacFarlane Davidson, Labour Corps
Lt. Ernest James Davies, Labour Corps
Temp Lt. Harry Cornwall Davies, Royal Engineers
Capt. John Davies, Royal Army Ordnance Corps
Temp Capt. Frank Gordon Davis, Royal Army Service Corps
Temp Capt. Leslie Stalman Davis, Royal Army Service Corps
Lt. John Kenneth Bomsfield Dawson, Army Cyclist Corps
Temp Capt. Ralph Deakan
Temp Lt.-Col. Maximilian John de Bathe, Labour Corps
Temp Capt. Auguste John Charles de Bavay, Royal Army Service Corps
Capt. and Bt. Maj. George Herbert Blackett Dechair  Royal Sussex Regiment
Maj. George De La Couf, Royal Army Medical Corps
Temp Maj. Hervey Francis De Montmorency  Royal Field Artillery
Capt. Arthur Dent  Royal Army Service Corps
Temp Maj. Frederic Rudolf Mackley De Paula
Adole De Putron, Deputy Controller, Queen Mary's Army Auxiliary Corps
Lt. Pierre Amédée de Savoie-Carignan de Soissons, Border Regiment
Rev. Francis Charles Devas  Royal Army Chaplains' Department
Rev. Philip Dominic Devas, Royal Army Chaplains' Department
Quartermaster and Capt. George Joseph Dickinson
Capt. Richard Frederick O'Toole Dickinson, Royal Army Medical Corps
Capt. William Michael Kington Dickinson, York and Lancaster Regiment
Capt. John Francis Douglas Dimock, Nottinghamshire and Derbyshire Regiment
Capt. Melville Dinwiddie  Gordon Highlanders
Temp Lt. Henry Philip Dix,  
Lt. Arthur Tollemache Dixon, Duke of Cornwall's Light Infantry
Lt. George Seymour Dixon, East Kent Regiment
Capt. Robert Garside Dixon, Royal Army Medical Corps
Maj. William Chester Dixon  Leicestershire Regiment, attd. Royal Army Ordnance Corps
Temp Capt. Roy Samuel Dobbins, Royal Army Medical Corps
Lt.-Col. Conway Richard Dobbs, Royal Engineers
Temp Lt. Archibald Forbes Dodds, Royal Army Ordnance Corps
Temp Capt. Jackson Dodds, Royal Army Ordnance Corps
Lt. Benjamin Dodsworth, T.F. Res
Capt. William Hamish Donald
Capt. Arthur William Hunter Donaldson, Royal Army Medical Corps
Maj. James Henry Douglass, Royal Army Medical Corps
Quartermaster and Capt. William Bernard Douthwaite, York and Lancaster Regiment
Lt. Oscar Follett Dowson, Royal Army Service Corps
Temp Hon Lt.-Col. Georges Dreyer, Royal Army Medical Corps
Temp Capt. James Douglas Driberg  Royal Army Medical Corps
Temp Capt. Thomas Drury, Labour Corps
Temp Capt. Cuthbert Dukes, Royal Army Medical Corps
Maj. Frederick Alexander Du Breul, Gloucestershire Regiment
Rev. James Duncan, Royal Army Chaplains' Department
Quartermaster and Lt. David Blaikie Duncan, Scottish Rifles
Maj. James Matthews Duncan, Royal Army Medical Corps
Capt. William Duncan, Royal Army Medical Corps
Maj. Allan Charlesworth Dundas, Middlesex Regiment
Maj. Arthur Dymock, Royal Army Ordnance Corps
Lt.-Col. Harry Bernard Dyson  Royal Scots
Capt. Augustus Thornhill Earle, Liverpool Regiment
Temp Capt. Ralph Parsons Earwaker, Royal Army Service Corps
Capt. Henry Rayner Eaton, Manchester Regiment, attd. Tank Corps
Temp Maj. Herbert Edgington, Royal Army Service Corps
Temp Capt. Walter Edgington, Royal Army Service Corps
Quartermaster and Capt. Edmund Edser, Royal Army Medical Corps
Temp Capt. John Augustus Edwards, Royal Army Veterinary Corps
Rev. Nathaniel Walter Allan Edwards  Royal Army Chaplains' Department
Lt. Walter Bernard Edwards  Worcestershire Regiment
Temp Capt. Douglas Rous Edwards-Ker, Royal Engineers
Lt. Leonard Alsager Elgood  Royal Highlanders
Maj. Clarence John Elkan  Royal Irish Fusiliers
Temp Maj. Arthur Addison Ellwood  Machine Gun Corps
Temp Capt. Robert Alan Erskine-Murray, Royal Engineers
Temp Lt. Harry Erwin, Royal Army Ordnance Corps
Lt. Arthur James Espley, East Lancashire Regiment 
Maj. John Evans, Royal Inniskilling Fusiliers
Quartermaster Maj. William Richard Evans, Royal Engineers
Temp Maj. William Stanley Divans, Royal Army Service Corps
Maj. John Everidge, Royal Army Medical Corps
Temp Maj. Gerald Valentine Ewart, Royal Army Service Corps
Maj. Nigel Harry Skinner Fargus  Royal Scots
Maj. Thomas William Fasson, Royal Army Ordnance Corps
Temp Lt.-Col. James Scott Fawcus, Labour Corps
Gladys Maud Feiling, Unit Administrator, Queen Mary's Army Auxiliary Corps
Temp Lt. Ernest Edward Fenn, Royal Engineers
Temp Maj. Ralph Lennox Fenner
Temp Maj. Samuel Greame Fenton, Royal Army Service Corps
Maj. James Ferguson, Royal Field Artillery
Capt. Montgomery du Bois Ferguson, Royal Army Medical Corps
Capt. Robert Fernie, Royal Field Artillery
Lt. Charles Gordon Ferrier, Yorkshire Hussars
Rev. William Field, Royal Army Chaplains' Department
Quartermaster and Capt. Charles Arthur Figg, Royal Army Medical Corps
Maj. William Robert Edward Heneage Finch, Manchester Regiment
Maj. Otto Sarony Fisher, Royal Army Veterinary Corps
Capt. Walter Bryan Flook, Royal Army Service Corps
Capt. Stephen Flowers  Royal Engineers
Temp Maj. Geared Robert Edward Foley, Royal Irish Rifles
Mary Gladys Corinne Foley  Sister-in-Charge, Queen Alexandra's Imperial Military Nursing Service
Temp Maj. Peter Trant Foley  Royal Munster Fusiliers
Temp Lt. Robert William Foot  Royal Field Artillery
Maj. Ronald Foster Forbes  Highland Light Infantry
Capt. Charles Forbes  Royal Army Medical Corps
Temp Maj. Stanley William Ford, Labour Corps
Capt. Arthur Norman Foster, Royal Army Veterinary Corps
Temp Capt. Edward Foster, Royal Army Service Corps
Maj. Frank Broome Foster, Royal Army Service Corps
Temp and Hon Maj. Kennedy Foster, Royal Army Medical Corps
Maj. Michael George Foster, Royal Army Medical Corps
Lt. William Fox, Scottish Rifles
Capt. Henry Frank Frampton, Labour Corps
Maj. Edward Franklin, Royal Army Veterinary Corps
Maj. James William Fraser  Seaforth Highlanders
Capt. Thomas Lockhead Fraser, Royal Army Medical Corps
Capt. Sir Charles Edward St. John Frederick  Northants. Yeomanry
Capt. John Sidney Fulton  Lancashire Fusiliers
Maj. Montague Furber, Royal Irish Rifles
Lt. Dennis Walter Furlong  Royal Berkshire Regiment
Temp Capt. Howell Woodwell Gabe, Royal Army Medical Corps
Temp Capt. Victor John Gadban, Labour Corps
Maj. Henry Gamble, Royal Army Veterinary Corps
Maj. Frank Harold Garraway  London Regiment
Capt. Arthur Gaunt, West Yorkshire Regiment
Temp Maj. Arthur Stretton Gaye, Royal Army Service Corps
Lt. William John Geddes, Royal Field Artillery
Temp Lt. Wilfred Harold George, Royal Engineers
Temp Capt. William Morrison Gibb, Tank Corps
Capt. Gerald Francis Petvin Gibbons, Royal Army Medical Corps
Temp Lt. Oliver Thomas Brice Gibbons, Machine Gun Corps
Temp Maj. Robert Harold Giblett, Royal Army Service Corps
Maj. Arthur Clare Vernon Gibson, Royal Army Ordnance Corps
Capt. Archibald John Gilchrist  Royal Army Medical Corps
Capt. Hylton Lloyd Giles, Norfolk Regiment
Lt. Bernard George Gillett, Indian Army Reserve of Officers
Lt.-Col. Geoffrey Goyer Gilligan  Argyll and Sutherland Highlanders
Lt. William Bertie Gimbeort, Royal Field Artillery
Capt. Francis William Crewe Godley, Royal Army Service Corps
Temp Capt. Hugh Stuart Trevor Goff, Royal Army Service Corps
Maj. Robert Elphinstone Dalrymple Goldingham, Royal Engineers
Maj. Henry Wetherall Goldney  Royal Artillery
Temp Capt. Bertram Francis Alex Gordon-Forbes, Royal Army Ordnance Corps
Capt. Francis Wilfred Gore-Langton, Coldstream Guards
Capt. Henry James Gorrie, Royal Army Medical Corps
Temp Capt. Charles Bernard Goulden, Royal Army Medical Corps
Maj. David James Graham  Royal Army Medical Corps
Temp Maj. John St. John Graham
Temp Capt. James Wells Graham
Temp Lt.-Col. Montagu James Grant-Peterkin, Cameron Highlanders
Maj. Arthur Claypon Horner Gray, Royal Army Medical Corps
Temp Lt. Joseph Alexander Gray, Royal Engineers
Maj. Reginald Wentworth Gray, Leinster Regiment
Capt. Douglas Harold Green  Royal Engineers
Temp Maj. William Robert Green, Royal Army Ordnance Corps
Maj. Frederick William Greenhill, Labour Corps
Maj. Albert David Greig  Royal Garrison Artillery
Temp Capt. Kenneth Clunie Greig, Royal Army Ordnance Corps
Temp Capt. Charles Beresford Fulke Greville, Lord Greville
Quartermaster and Capt. Ernest Moore Griorson, Royal Army Medical Corps
Capt. Owen Charles Guinness, Worcestershire Regiment
Temp Lt. John Cedric Gurney
Capt. Edward Martin Guy, Northumberland Hussars
Rev. Edward James Hagan, Royal Army Chaplains' Department
Temp Capt. John Alicius Haig, Royal Army Service Corps
Maj. Henry Engelbert Hake, Royal Warwickshire Regiment
Maj. Bertram Arthur Montagu Hall, Royal Garrison Artillery
Rev. James Thomas Hall, Royal Army Chaplains' Department
Temp Capt. Vincent Claud Hall, Royal Engineers
Temp Maj. William Henry Hall
Lt.-Col. Alexander George Hamilton, Royal Army Medical Corps
Maj. Norman Chiyas Hamilton  Royal Army Service Corps
Temp Capt. Ralph Ashton Hamlyn, Royal Army Service Corps
Temp Maj. Geoffrey Hyde Barclay Hanbury, Royal Army Service Corps
Rev. Guy Somerset Hanbury, Royal Army Chaplains' Department
Capt. William Yenning Glanville Hancock, Royal Garrison Artillery
Lt. William Gemmill Chalmers Hanna, Seaforth Highlanders
Temp Capt. Nicholas James Hannen, Royal Army Service Corps
Temp Lt. Arthur George Harding, Royal Army Ordnance Corps
Capt. Philip Edward Harding  London Regiment
Capt. Richard Spalding Harding, 5th Battalion, North Staffordshire Regiment
Lt. Noel de Courcy Hardwick, Indian Army Reserve of Officers
Temp Maj. Frank Buckland Hardy, Royal Army Service Corps
Rev. Ernest James Harewood, Royal Army Chaplains' Department
Lt. Laurence Appleyard Hargreaves, Royal Army Service Corps
Rev. Thomas Alphonsus Harker, Royal Army Chaplains' Department
Temp Maj. Reginald Tristram Harper, Royal Army Veterinary Corps
Temp Maj. Harold D. Harpham, Labour Corps
Temp Maj. William Lewis Harpur, Royal Engineers
Temp Capt. Guy Summerell Harris, Royal Army Service Corps
Temp Lt. Leopold Jonas Harris, Royal Engineers
Temp Maj. Frank Harrison  
Temp Maj. Francis Edward Harrison, Royal Engineers
Temp Capt. James Norman Jackson Hartley, Royal Army Medical Corps
Quartermaster and Capt. Arthur Hastings Hartshorn, Royal Engineers
Temp Lt. Stuart Henderson Hastie  Highland Light Infantry
Lt.-Col. John Henry Hastings  West Yorkshire Regiment
Temp Capt. George Hawkins, Royal Army Service Corps
Capt. Harold John Charlton Hawkins, Royal Army Service Corps
Capt. Cuthbert Morley Headlam  Bedfordshire Yeomanry
Capt. Edward Hearne, Royal Army Veterinary Corps
Capt. Gilbert Stanley Heathcote  Nottinghamshire and Derbyshire Regiment
Capt. the Hon Arnold Henderson, Royal Wiltshire Yeomanry
Temp Maj. George Richard Hennessy
Lt. Edward Dave Asher Herbert, Royal Garrison Artillery
Lt.-Col. Henry Carden Herbert, South Lancashire Regiment 
Temp Capt. Arthur Cochran Herdman
Temp Capt. William Herrick, Royal Army Service Corps
Temp Capt. Robert Charles Herron, Royal Army Service Corps
Maj. Alfred Herbert Heslop  Royal Army Medical Corps
Rev. Sydney Rangeley Hewitt, Royal Army Chaplains' Department (dated 15 February 1919.)
Lt. Dorglas Heyde, Royal Engineers
Capt. and Bt. Maj. Francis Albert Heymann, Royal Engineers
Lt.-Col. Cecil Francis Heyworth-Savage, Royal Fusiliers
Maj. Thomas Hibbard  Royal Army Veterinary Corps
Temp Lt. George Hibbert
Capt. and Bt. Maj. Lancelot Daryl Hickes  Royal Garrison Artillery
Capt. Thomas Twistington Higgins  Royal Army Medical Corps
Temp Maj. Herbert John Hill  Royal Engineers
Temp Maj. Lionel Edward Hill  Royal Engineers
Maj. and Bt. Lt.-Col. Charles Edward Hills, Royal Army Service Corps
Temp Maj. Reginald Playfair Hills  
Capt. Harold Montague Hinde, Royal Army Service Corps
Lt. Harold Hammondv Hindmarsh
Lt.-Col. Claud Vere Cavendish Hobart  T.F. Res
Rev. Philip Giffard Holden, Royal Army Chaplains' Department
Temp Capt. William Jeffkins Holdich, Labour Corps
Capt. John Evelyn Holdsworth, 2nd Dragoon Guards
Temp Lt. Ronald Morris Holland, Royal Army Ordnance Corps
Temp Capt. Theodore Samuel Holland
Temp Lt. Vyvyan Beresford Holland, Royal Field Artillery
Quartermaster and Capt. George Holley, Lancashire Fusiliers
Lt. Henry Arthur Holland  Royal Garrison Artillery
Temp Maj. Arthur Joseph Holloway, Royal Engineers
Temp Lt. Dan Campbell Holmes, Tank Corps
Lt. Alfred Ernest Holmes-Brown, Royal Garrison Artillery
Capt. Thomas Nathaniel Hone, King's Royal Rifle Corps
Temp Maj. Charles William Menelaub Hope, Royal Army Medical Corps
Maj. Charles-Spread Hope-Johnstone, Royal Field Artillery
Temp Lt. Thomas Hollis Hopkins  Royal Engineers
Lt. James Davidson Hossack, Seaforth Highlanders
Temp Capt. Hugh Roberts Howard, Royal Army Service Corps
Capt. Norman Howell, Royal Field Artillery
Temp Capt. Reginald Kirshaw Hubbard, Royal Army Service Corps
Maj. John Huck, Border Regiment
Temp Capt. and Bt. Maj. Ernest John Hudson
Maj. Robert Challis Hudson, Royal Army Service Corps
Capt. and Bt. Maj. Frederick St. John Hughes  Staff
Temp Capt. John Trevor Hughes-Jones, Royal Army Ordnance Corps
Capt. FitzHerbert Hugo  
Temp Maj. Henry Herbert Humphreys  Royal Army Service Corps
Rev. Joseph Wellington Hunkin  Royal Army Chaplains' Department
Maj. Cecil Stuart Hunter  Royal Garrison Artillery
Capt. Herbert Francis Searancks Huntington, Welsh Regiment
Temp Lt.-Col. Arthur Reginald Hurst  Royal Field Artillery
Temp Lt. Arthur Vivian Hussey, Royal Engineers
Maj. Thomas-Massie Hutchinson  Royal Army Service Corps
Temp Capt. Eric Henry Philip-Blundell Ince
Capt. Alexander Reid Inglis
Temp Lt. Bruce Stirling Ingram  Royal Garrison Artillery
Temp Lt. Arthur Cecil Inskip, Labour Corps
Temp Capt. Swinscho James Jackson, Royal Irish Regiment
Rev. John Thomas Jacob, Royal Army Chaplains' Department
Lt. Jonathan Jacobs, Royal Field Artillery
Temp Capt. David Napier Jameson, Royal Army Service Corps
Maj. Charles Francis Cracroft Jarvis, Lincolnshire Regiment
Temp Capt. Herbert Jefferson, Royal Army Service Corps
Temp Maj. Lawrence Wynyard Jenner, Royal Army Service Corps
Lt. Leonard Jennings, Northed Hussars
Temp Maj. Bernard Jessop, Royal Engineers
Maj. Frederick William Johnson, Royal Army Medical Corps
Capt. Harry Bertram Johnson  Royal Army Ordnance Corps
Capt. John Johnston, Royal Scots
Temp Quartermaster and Capt. Robert George Johnston, Royal Army Medical Corps
Lt. Charles Jones, Royal Army Service Corps
Gladys Alicia Jones  Deputy Controller, Queen Mary's Army Auxiliary Corps
Temp Lt. John Jones, Royal Army Ordnance Corps
Capt. John Lloyd Charles Jones, Royal Army Veterinary Corps
Capt. John Howard Jones, Royal Army Veterinary Corps
Temp Lt. Harold George Jordan, Royal Engineers
Temp Capt. Frederick Percy Joscelyne  Royal Army Medical Corps
Temp Capt. Thomas Bettsworth Keep, Royal Army Service Corps
Maj. George Theodore Elphinstone Keith  Royal Lancaster Regiment
Maj. Rudolph Henry Keller  Nottinghamshire and Derbyshire Regiment
Temp Maj. Philip Travice Rubie Kellner  Royal Engineers
Temp Capt. Arthur Lindsay Kelly, King's Royal Rifle Corps
Rev. George Kendall, Royal Army Chaplains' Department
Temp Capt. Edgar Stephen Kemp
Lt.-Col. Archibald Arrol Kennedy  Scottish Rifles
Maj. Guy Belfield Kensington, Royal Engineers
Capt. John Joseph Guiney Keppel, Royal Army Veterinary Corps
Capt. Colin King, Royal Army Medical Corps
Capt. Frank King  4th Hussars
Maj. Lancelot Noel Friedrick Irving King, Royal Engineers
Capt. Leonard Algernon Bertram King
Lt. William Kirby, Anson Battalion, Royal Naval Division 
Lt. Alan Kennedy Kitson, Royal Army Service Corps
Capt. Walter Frederick Clifford Kitson, Royal Army Service Corps
Maj. Cecil Davenport Knight, 6th Dragoon Guards
Capt. Ernest Knight, Royal Army Medical Corps
Temp Capt. William Collins Knight, Lincolnshire Regiment
Maj. George Patrick Knott, Royal Army Veterinary Corps
Lt. Arthur Ernest George Knowling, Royal Army Service Corps
Temp Maj. Louis Francis Knuthsen, Royal Army Medical Corps
Rev. Carey Frederick Knyvett, Royal Army Chaplains' Department
Lt. Charles Mendel Kohan, Royal Artillery
Temp Maj. Carl Hans Kuhne  Royal Army Service Corps
Temp Capt. James Lang, Royal Engineers
Temp Capt. Alfred Lawrence, Royal Army Ordnance Corps
Temp Quartermaster and Capt. Ernest Evelyn Lister Lawson, Nottinghamshire and Derbyshire Regiment
Temp Capt. John Hurleston Leche, 12th Lancers
Quartermaster and Capt. Herbert Benjamin Lee, Royal Army Medical Corps
Hon Maj. Lennie Henry Lee, Indian Army Reserve of Officers
Temp Maj. George Lees, Royal Army Ordnance Corps
Lt. Cecil Henry Legg, Royal Army Service Corps
Maj. Frank Bertram Legh  Royal Engineers
Maj. Robert Walter Dickson Leslie, Royal Army Medical Corps
Capt. and Bt. Maj. Joseph Henry Levey  Gordon Highlanders
Temp Lt. Jamea Charles Lewis, Royal Army Service Corps
Temp Capt. Thomas Percy Lewis, Royal Army Medical Corps
Temp Capt. Dudley Mark Percy Liddle, Royal Army Service Corps
Temp Capt. Walker Stewart Lindsay, Royal Army Medical Corps
Rev. Charles Edward Chaloner Lindsey, Royal Army Chaplains' Department
Maj. D'Arcy Hunter Little, London Regiment
Temp Maj. Everard Frederick Ernest Livesey
Quartermaster and Capt. John Stewart Livingstone, Middlesex Regiment
Lt. Robert Heaton Livingstone, South Staffordshire Regiment
Lt. Charles Herbert Llewellin  Royal Engineers
Lt.-Col. Arthur Llewellyn
Capt. John Daniel Stuart Lloyd  Welsh Horse
Maj. Llewellyn Hubert Lloyd, Royal Army Service Corps
Temp Capt. Arthur Lock, Royal Army Service Corps
Temp Lt. Norman Charles Lockhart, Royal Field Artillery
Quartermaster and Maj. John Lockie
Lt. Acting Maj. Frederick Robert Logan  Lancashire Fusiliers
Temp Capt. Walter Long, Royal Army Service Corps
Capt. Henry Hardman Lord, Royal Army Veterinary Corps
Capt. James Vass Lorimer, Royal Army Service Corps
Temp Capt. Cecil Hubert Loveridge
Alice Mary Lowe  Department Controller, Queen Mary's Army Auxiliary Corps
Capt. James Lawson Low, Gordon Highlanders
Temp Maj. Mervyn Hanbury Lowther-Clarke
Temp Capt. Alfred Ludlow-Hewitt, Royal Army Service Corps
Temp Capt. Norman Peace Lacy Lumb, Royal Army Medical Corps
Temp Capt. Thomas Gerhard Leslie Luson, Royal Army Service Corps
Temp Lt.-Col. John Clifford Vacy Lyle  labour Corps
Lt. Kenneth Lyon, Royal Artillery
Quartermaster and Capt. William James McArthur
Elizabeth Lusk Macauley, Acting Sister, Queen Alexandra's Imperial Military Nursing Service
Temp 2nd Lt. Henry Hector MacColl
Temp Capt. Charles Ogle Maconachie  Royal Army Veterinary Corps
Capt. Frederic de Cree McCracken, Royal Army Service Corps
Temp Maj. Cuthbert Laud MacDona
Temp Capt. Charles James Lewis McDonald  
Temp Capt. Francis Caven MacDonald  Royal Army Medical Corps
Temp Maj. James Ratcliff McDonald, Labour Corps
Maj.Duncan MacDonald, Royal Army Veterinary Corps
Temp Capt. Frederick George MacDougall, Royal Engineers
Maj. William Allen McDougall  Royal Army Veterinary Corps
Temp Capt. Alexander McDowell, Royal Engineers
Temp Capt. William MacEwen, Royal Army Medical Corps
Capt. Ronald Bute MacFie, Royal Army Medical Corps
Capt. Alexander Muir McGrigor, Gloucestershire Yeomanry
Rev. Daniel John McHugh, Royal Army Chaplains' Department
Capt. Robert Whyte MacKay, Gordon Highlanders
Temp Capt. Colin Mackenzie, Royal Army Medical Corps
Capt. Alexander MacKenzie, Royal Army Veterinary Corps
Temp Maj. James McLachlan, Royal Engineers
Temp Maj. Adam Gordon MacLeod  Royal Army Service Corps
Maj. Gerald MacMahon, Patrick Ruadh, Royal Artillery
Rev. John Victor MacMillan, Royal Army Chaplains' Department
Capt. Ernest Ronald MacPherson, Gordon Highlanders
Captl Malcolm Munro MacPherson, Seaforth Highlanders
Maj. John Charles MacSwiney, Connaught Rangers
Temp Capt. Thomas MacVey
Temp Capt. William Reginald Major, Royal Engineers
Capt. Frank Haistone Malyon, 21st Punjabis, Indian Army
Capt. Percival Ramsey Mann, London Regiment
Capt. David Murdock Marr, Royal Army Medical Corps
Capt. Herbert Marriott
Capt. Samuel Warburton Marriott, Royal Army Veterinary Corps
Lt.-Col. Roger Dodington Marriott, West Somerset Yeomanry
Maj. John Henry Frederick Marsden  Nottinghamshire and Derbyshire Regiment
Temp Capt. Octavius de Burgh Marsh, Royal Army Medical Corps
Capt. Geoffrey Marshall, Royal Army Medical Corps
Lt. Hugh John Cole Marshall, Royal Engineers
Maj. Isa Carswell Marshall, Royal Army Medical Corps
Maj. Charles James Martin  Royal Army Medical Corps
Maj. and Bt. Lt.-Col. Gerald Hamilton Martin  King's Royal Rifle Corps
Maj. Anthony Wood Martyn  Royal West Kent Regiment
Maj. Samuel Martyn  Royal Army Medical Corps
Maj. Maurice Edward Mascall  Royal Garrison Artillery
Temp Capt. and Bt. Maj. Edward Mason, Royal Army Service Corps
Capt. Robert Wyllie Mason, Royal Army Service Corps
Temp Capt. Robert Massie, Royal Army Medical Corps
Lt. William Masterson, Royal West Surrey Regiment
Capt. and Bt. Maj. William Eyre Matcham  Rem. Service
Maj. Harry Gerald Keith Matchett, Connaught Rangers
Maj. David Mathers  Royal Inniskilling Fusiliers
Temp Capt. Edmond George Matheson, Royal Engineers
Lt. Felton Arthur Hamilton Mathew  Royal Engineers
Lt. Herbert Matthews 
Temp Capt. Richard Mawson Mattocks
Temp Maj. Charles Raymond Maude  
Capt. and Bt. Maj. Christian George Maude  Royal Fusiliers
Capt. Ronald Edmund Maude, Royal Army Service Corps
Lt. Ernest Ricardo Maund
Temp Capt. Octavius Studdert Maunsell, Royal Army Medical Corps
Temp Capt. William Willmott Mawson, Leicestershire Regiment
Temp Maj. Noel Bankart May, Royal Army Ordnance Corps
Temp Capt. Arthur Hubert Maycock, Royal Army Service Corps
Maj. Denis John Meagher, Indian Army
Capt. Henry Louis Meagher, Royal Field Artillery
Temp Capt. Richard John Rupert Measham, Royal Engineers
Temp Capt. John Clarence Medcalfe, Royal Army Ordnance Corps
Maj. John Seymour Mellor  King's Royal Rifle Corps
Maj. Henry Chase Meredith, Shropshire Yeomanry
Lt.-Col. Francis Killigrew Seymour Metford  labour Corps
Temp Capt. Harry Vincent Mercer Metivier, Royal Army Veterinary Corps
Lt. Everard Charles Meynell  Royal Field Artillery
Temp Capt. Robert Alexander Lindley Meynell
Lt.-Col. Spencer Mildred  Royal Engineers
Temp Capt. James Cousins Miller, Royal Army Veterinary Corps
Temp Capt. Edward Thomas Campbell Milligan, Royal Army Medical Corps
Lt.-Col. Harry Dacres Millward, Worcestershire Regiment
Temp Maj. John Malcolm Mitchell  
Temp Lt. Leonard Ernest Mold, Royal Engineers
Capt. Roger Murray Moncrieff, Royal Highlanders
Maj. Hon. George Vere Arundell Monckton-Arundell  1st Life Guards
Capt. Kenneth Robertson Money
Capt. Gordon Wickham Monier Williams  London Regiment
Capt. Frederick James Osbaldeston Montagu  Coldstream Guards
Capt. St. John Edward Montagu, Northumberland Fusiliers
Lt. Vivian Charles Montagu, Honourable Artillery Company
Temp Lt. Charles Edward Montague
Capt. Hugh Glencairn Monteith  Royal Army Medical Corps
Capt. John Musparatt Mood  Royal Dublin Fusiliers
Lt. Jasper Moon, Liverpool Regiment
Quartermaster and Capt. James Moore  Royal Army Service Corps
Capt. James York Moore, Royal Army Medical Corps
Temp Capt. Robert Foster Moore, Royal Army Medical Corps
Capt. John William Moran, Royal Army Service Corps
Temp Lt. Stanley Herbert Morgan, Royal Engineers
Capt. Thomas Morgan, Henry, T.F. Res
Temp Capt. Ernest Morison, East Yorkshire Regiment
Temp Capt. Arthur Claude Morrell  
Maj. Frederick Morris  Royal Army Ordnance Corps
Temp Capt. John Tertius Morrison, Royal Army Medical Corps
Capt. Edwin Ralph Maddison Morton, Royal Army Service Corps
2nd Lt. Arthur Morwood, Royal Engineers
Lt. Kenneth Neville Moss, Royal Engineers
Temp Capt. Francis Henry Meson, Royal Army Medical Corps
Capt. Albert Edward Phayre Mudge, Royal Inniskilling Fusiliers
Temp Capt. George Muir, Royal Engineers
Temp Maj. Robert Godfrey Mundy, Royal Army Service Corps
Temp Capt. Leonard Munn, Royal Engineers
Temp Maj. Robert Murdoch, Royal Army Service Corps
Temp Capt. James Murphy, Labour Corps
Temp Maj. Walter Murray  Royal Engineers
Lt. Walter Andrew Myles, South Lancashire Regiment 
Temp Capt. Charles James Napier  
Quartermaster and Capt. Alfred Neate, Somerset Light Infantry
Temp Lt. Frederick Harry Neate, Royal Engineers
Capt. Alfred Owen Needham  Lancashire Fusiliers
Temp Maj. James Easthope Needham, Labour Corps
Temp Capt. George London Neil, Royal Army Medical Corps
Maj. Leopold Monk Newell, Royal Army Service Corps
Temp Quartermaster and Capt. Frederick Herbert Newman, Royal West Surrey Regiment
Maj. Richard Ernest Upton Newman  Royal Army Medical Corps
Temp Capt. Vincent Chester Newman, Royal Marines
Temp Capt. Charles Todd Newsome, Royal Army Service Corps
Hon Lt.-Col. Edward Hall Nicholas, Royal Army Medical Corps
Capt. James Edward Nieholls
Temp Maj. Henry Scoble Nicholson, Labour Corps
Rev. George Erskine Nicol, Royal Army Chaplains' Department
Capt. Randall James Nicol, Argyll and Sutherland Highlanders
Capt. Frederick Alan Benson Nicoll, Royal Sussex Regiment
Capt. Bertram Wilfred Noble, Honourable Artillery Company
Lt. Hon. Charles Hubert Francis Noel, Coldstream Guards
Maj. Edward Hubert Norman  Royal West Kent Regiment
Capt. Harold James Northcott, Royal Army Service Corps
Temp Maj. Charles John Norwood, Royal Army Service Corps
Temp Capt. William Oates, Royal Engineers
Quartermaster and Lt.-Col. John O'Donnell
Capt. Robert Louis O'Grady
Temp Quartermaster and Capt. Ernest O'Hara, Royal Army Medical Corps
Capt. John William O'Kelly, Royal Army Veterinary Corps
Rev. Gordon Miles Staveley Oldham, Royal Army Chaplains' Department
Temp Capt. Edward Victor Oliver, Royal Army Ordnance Corps
Temp Maj. Matthew William Bailie Oliver, Royal Army Medical Corps
Temp Lt. Arthur Edward Olley, Royal Garrison Artillery
Lt. Rupert Charles Ollivant, Royal Field Artillery
Lt. Henry Michael O'Riordan, Labour Corps
Capt. Thomas Maclay Ormiston, Royal Army Medical Corps
Quartermaster and Maj. John Williams Osborne, Royal Army Medical Corps
Temp Capt. James Bell Osier, Royal Army Service Corps
Temp 2nd Lt. Bertram Maurice Owen  Royal Engineers
Maj. Randle Harry Palin, Indian Army
Temp Capt. Alexander Croyden Palmer, Royal Army Medical Corps
Temp Maj. Herbert James Leslie Palmer, Royal Army Ordnance Corps
Temp Capt. Albert Pam
Temp Lt. Edgar Pam, Royal Engineers
Temp Maj. Beltran William Parker, Royal Army Service Corps
Frances Mary Parker  Deputy Controller, Queen Mary's Army Auxiliary Corps
Rev. Joseph Parker, Royal Army Chaplains' Department
Lt. Sidney James Parker, Royal Fusiliers
Lt. Maj. Herbert-Denis Parkin  Royal Army Service Corps
Capt. Matthew Wallace Paterson  Royal Army Medical Corps
Capt. Hanfoury Pawle, Royal Berkshire Regiment
Temp Lt.-Col. William Ellis Peachey, Labour Corps
Temp Maj. Edward Gordon Peake, Royal Engineers
Temp Capt. Edward Oscar Pearce, Royal Engineers
Capt. Basil Lancelot Pearson, Royal Army Service Corps
2nd Lt. Donald Munroe Peattie, Labour Corps
Temp Quartermaster and Capt. Sidney James Pearsall, Nottinghamshire and Derbyshire Regiment
Capt. John Cyril Étienne Pellereau, Royal Field Artillery
Maj. Edward Samuel Penrose, Essex Regiment
Temp Capt. William Hughes Perkins, Royal Engineers
Capt. Henry Marrian Joseph Perry, Royal Army Medical Corps
Maj. Guy Lansbury Peterson, Royal Army Service Corps
Capt. William de Malet Peyton  Royal Army Medical Corps
Temp Lt. Albert John Philpot, Royal Engineers
Capt. William Robertus Pierce, Royal Army Medical Corps
Temp Quartermaster and Capt. Frederick William Pillow
Temp Capt. Albert Edward Pinniger, Royal Army Medical Corps
Capt. Matthew George Platts  Royal Engineers
2nd Lt. Frederick Plucknett, Labour Corps
Capt. James Joseph Plunkett, Royal Army Veterinary Corps
Maj. Francis Garden Poole  Middlesex Regiment
Temp Capt. Mark Pooles, Royal Army Service Corps
Capt. Andrew Noble Pope, Royal Fusiliers
Temp Capt. John Peyser, Royal Army Service Corps
Maj. Prescott Anson Prescott-Roberts, Royal Army Service Corps
Temp Capt. Charles Weaver Price  Tank Corps
Edith Mary Pidden  Department Controller, Queen Mary's Army Auxiliary Corps
Temp Capt. Edward Procter, Royal Engineers
Maj. Albert Westlake Pryce-Jones, Royal Welsh Fusiliers
Maj. George Douglas Pullar, Royal Highlanders
Temp Capt. John Lindsay Pullar, Royal Highlanders
Maj. Charles Evelyn Pym, Suffolk Yeomanry
Lt. George Rainsford, Labour Corps
Temp Capt. William Ramage, Royal Army Service Corps
Temp Capt. Ronald Arthur Ramsay, King's Own Yorkshire Light Infantry
Maj. Ernest Charles Raper
Temp Maj. Harold Raymond  
Capt. Hugh Phillips Raymond, Royal Army Service Corps
Temp Lt. Charles Edward Hay Reckitt, Royal Engineers
Temp Maj. Arthur Edward Redfern  
Maj. Blethyn Treherne Rees, Monmouthshire Regiment
Temp Capt. William Arthur Rees, Royal Army Medical Corps
Capt. Temp Maj. Graham Beauchamp-Coxeter Rees-Mogg, Royal Army Veterinary Corps, attd. 1st Life Guards
Quartermaster and Capt. William Clifford Renton, Royal Army Medical Corps
Maj. Theodore Rich, Royal Engineers
Lt. Malcolm John Richards, Royal Garrison Artillery
Capt. Harry Richardson  Royal Engineers
Maj. John Duncan Richmond  Royal Army Medical Corps
Maj. Hon Jasper Nicholas Ridley, Northamptonshire Hussars
Maj. William Percy Rigden  Special Reserve
Maj. Michael Balfour Hutchinson Ritchie  Royal Army Medical Corps
Capt. Robert Linton Ritchie, Royal Army Medical Corps
Temp Capt. James Ernest Holme Roberts, Royal Army Medical Corps
Capt. Alfred Leopold Robertson, Royal Army Medical Corps
Temp Maj. Donald Struon Robertson, Royal Army Service Corps
Capt. Frederick William Robertson, Royal Scots
Temp Capt. Robert Charles Robertson, Royal Army Medical Corps
Capt. Augustus Francis Robinson, London Regiment
Temp Capt. John Robson
Temp Capt. Herbert Charles Rockett, Royal Army Veterinary Corps
Maj. Henry Buckley Roderick, Royal Army Medical Corps
Capt. Henry Waters Lyttelton Rogers, Royal Irish Rifles
Capt. Harry Duggan Rollinson, Royal Army Medical Corps
Temp Capt. Charles Robert Ritchie Romer
Lt. Robert Wolfgang Bomer, Royal Field Artillery
Capt. Walter Joseph Ronan  Royal Army Medical Corps
Maj. William Robert Rook, Nottinghamshire and Derbyshire Regiment
Temp Maj. Leslie Roseveare, Royal Engineers
Capt. Angus Ross, Cameron Highlanders
Quartermaster and Capt. Charles Thomas Ross, Royal Army Medical Corps
Capt. William Henry Rowell, Royal Army Medical Corps
Maj. Harry Lancelot Ruck-Keene  Oxfordshire and Buckinghamshire Light Infantry
Capt. Ernest Gordon Russell, Royal Army Service Corps
Capt. William Sydney Kemp Russell, Royal Sussex Regiment
Capt. Percival Thomas Rutherford, Royal Army Medical Corps
Maj. Thomas Geoffrey Ruttledge  Connaught Rangers
Maj. Robert Minturn Clarges Ruxton, Labour Corps
Capt. Pierce Neimeyer Ryan, Royal Army Service Corps
Rev. William Ryan, Royal Army Chaplains' Department
Temp Capt. Herbert Henry Sampson  Royal Army Medical Corps
Temp Maj. Edmund Thomas Bandars
Temp Capt. James Frances Sandon
Temp Maj. William Roger Sanguinetti  Royal Engineers
Rev. William Henry Sarchet  Royal Army Chaplains' Department
Temp Maj. Ernest Satchwell, Royal Army Service Corps
Temp Maj. Graham Francis Henry Satow, Machine Gun Corps
Temp Capt. Hugh Ralph Satow
Temp Capt. Harold Willis Scawin, Royal Army Medical Corps
Temp Capt. Ellis Keith Scholtz, Royal Army Service Corps
Temp Lt. Basil Ferdinand Jamieson Schonland, Royal Engineers
Temp Lt.-Col. Norman Gibib Soorgie, Army Printing and Stationery Services
Capt. David Jobson Scott  Royal Army Medical Corps
Temp Lt. Frank Scott, Royal Engineers
Temp Lt.-Col. James Edward Scott, Indian Army Reserve of Officers
Maj. John Creagh Scott  Argyll and Sutherland Highlanders
Capt. Frank Sutherland Scruby, Cambridgeshire Regiment
Temp Maj. Edward Wilmot Seale, Royal Engineers
Capt. Philip Temple Sealy, Royal Army Service Corps
Temp Capt. Edward James Selby, Royal Army Medical Corps
Temp Lt. Martin Perronet Sells, Royal Engineers
Lt. William Boyd Selous, Royal Garrison Artillery
Quartermaster and Capt. Alfred George Shackleton, Royal Fusiliers
Temp Capt. Herbert Park Shackleton, Royal Army Medical Corps
Maj. Gerald Whittaker Sharpe, Royal Lancaster Regiment
Lt. Frank Deeks Sharpies, Royal Army Service Corps
Maj. Arthur Godfrey Shaw  East Yorkshire Regiment
Temp Maj. Thomas Alfred Shaw, Royal Engineers
Helen Mildred Sheppard, Department Controller, Queen Mary's Army Auxiliary Corps
Temp Capt. Frederick Walton Shilton
Lt. Frederick Edgar Shipp, Royal Army Service Corps
Temp Capt. John Kercheval Sidebottom, Royal Engineers
Maj. Edward Herbert Simpson  Liverpool Regiment
Lt.-Col. George Charles Edward Simpson, Royal Army Medical Corps
Temp Maj. Selwyn George Simpson, Royal Army Service Corps
Lt.-Col. Harold Simson, Royal Army Medical Corps
Temp Maj. Henry Arnott Sissons, Royal Engineers
Temp Capt. Augustus William Smith
Capt. Daniel Rowland Smith  Royal Army Ordnance Corps
Temp Capt. Felix Patrick Smith
Capt. George William Smith, Royal Army Medical Corps
Temp Maj. Isaac Claude Victor Smith, Royal Army Service Corps
Lt.-Col. Samuel Boylan Smith  Royal Army Medical Corps
Capt. Stanley Smith, Royal Army Service Corps
Lt. Patrick Cecil Smythe, Royal Highlanders
Capt. Gerald Merson Sorley, London Regiment
Capt. Percy Lionel Spafford, Royal Army Service Corps
Capt. Herbert Benjamin Speke, Northumberland Fusiliers
Capt. Sidney George Spoor, Royal Army Service Corps
Temp Capt. George Spyer
Lt. Reginald Alfred Squires, King's Own Yorkshire Light Infantry
Rev. James Stack, Royal Army Chaplains' Department
Capt. Robert Humphry Stallard, Royal Engineers
Capt. Sydney Stallard  London Regiment
Temp Lt. Colin Lundin Stanhope
Lt. Ernest Raymond Stanley, South Staffordshire Regiment
Lt. Frank Charles Stannard  Royal Field Artillery
Capt. Reginald Samuel Sherrard Statham, Royal Army Medical Corps
Temp Lt. Gabriel Steel, Royal Engineers
Lt.-Col. Guy Neville Stephen, Royal Army Medical Corps
Capt. Edward James Stevens, Royal Artillery
Temp Lt. Bertrand James Stevenson
Capt. George Henderson Stevenson  Royal Army Medical Corps
Temp Maj. Aubrey George Battersby Stewart, Royal Army Ordnance Corps
Temp Maj. Donald Maclver Stewart, Royal Engineers
Quartermaster and Capt. William Henry Stewart, Manchester Regiment
Capt. Ralph William Ewart Stockings, Royal Army Medical Corps
Capt. Patrick Douglas Stirling  West Riding Regiment
Temp Capt. William Stirling, Royal Army Medical Corps
Capt. William Stobie, Royal Army Medical Corps
Capt. Hugh Charles Stockwell, Highland Light Infantry
Temp Capt. Adrian Stokes  Royal Army Medical Corps
Temp Capt. Henry Stokes, Royal Army Medical Corps
Capt. Francis Holland Storr
Temp Capt. George Stow, Royal Engineers
Temp Capt. Granville Edward Stewart Streatfield  Royal Engineers
Temp Capt. Edward Joseph Stuckey, Royal Army Medical Corps
Capt. Robert Luambton Surtees, Shropshire Light Infantry
Capt. Richard Woodward Swayne, Royal Army Medical Corps
Lt.-Col. Michael James Sweetman, Labour Corps
Capt. Stanley William Sykes  
Lt. John Symes, Devonshire Regiment
Temp Lt.-Col. George John Tagg, Royal Engineers
2nd Lt. Harry Targett, Royal West Surrey Regiment
Capt. William Tayleur, Shropshire Yeomanry
Temp Maj. Alfred Jessie Taylor, Royal Army Service Corps
Temp Capt. Douglas Compton Taylor, Royal Army Medical Corps
Quartermaster and Capt. Douglas Percy Taylor, Royal Army Medical Corps
Maj. Edgar Charles Taylor, Royal Engineers
Temp Capt. Eric Stewart Taylor, Royal Army Medical Corps
Temp Maj. Gordon Taylor, Royal Army Medical Corps
Rev. Harold Milman Strickland Taylor, Royal Army Chaplains' Department
Lt. Hugh Lamport Taylor, Royal Field Artillery
Temp Capt. George Arthur James Teasdale, Royal Field Artillery
Maj. Bartholomew Louis Charles Teeling, Royal Army Service Corps
Temp Lt. Ernest William Dalrymple Tennant
Maj. Henry Augustus Brelfney Ternan, East Kent Regiment
Maj. Cyril Edward Terry, Royal Army Service Corps
Maj. Noel Edmund Osbert Thackwell, Royal Garrison Artillery
Temp Capt. Bernard Henry Thomas, Royal Army Service Corps
Lt. Percy Edward Thomas, Royal Engineers
Rev. Richard Albert Thomas, Royal Army Chaplains' Department
Temp Capt. Robert John Thomas, Royal Engineers
Capt. Arthur Landsborough Thomson
Temp Maj. Edward Thompson, Royal Engineers
Temp Capt. James Osbourne Thompson, late King's Own Yorkshire Light Infantry
Temp Quartermaster and Capt. Walter Wright Thompson, Lancashire Fusiliers
Temp Capt. Leslie Thorns  
Temp Lt. Basil Albert Thornton
Lt.-Col. John Claud Thorp  Royal Army Ordnance Corps
Capt. John Henry Thorpe, Manchester Regiment
Lt. Claude Tizard  Royal Berkshire Regiment
Temp Capt. Arthur Theodore Todd  Royal Army Medical Corps
Temp Capt. Sam Todd
Capt. Leonard Robert Tosswill, Royal Army Medical Corps
Lt. Philip Henry Townsend, Royal Army Service Corps
Maj. James Paumier Tredennick  Royal Dublin Fusiliers
Capt. Horace Edgar Howard Tripp, Royal Army Service Corps
Temp Maj. Roy Francis Truscott
Maj. Frederick Gordon Tucker, London Regiment
Temp Capt. Gerald Tudor, Labour Corps
Temp Capt. Claude Lewie Devenish Tully
Temp Capt. Francis Gordon Turner  
Lt. George Cunningham Tylor, Royal Field Artillery
Very Rev. Canon Hon Leonard Francis Tyrwhitt  Royal Army Chaplains' Department
Lt. Owen Underbill, Shropshire Light Infantry
Temp Capt. Richard Lewis Unsworth, Royal Army Service Corps
Temp Lt. Thomas Haynes Upton, Royal Engineers
Capt. Lyndall Fownes Urwick  Worcestershire Regiment
Capt. Albert Robert Valon  Royal Army Ordnance Corps
Temp Maj. Arthur Owen Vaughan  labour Corps
Quartermaster and Capt. Frank Veal, West Yorkshire Regiment
Temp Capt. Philip Northcote Vellacott, Royal Army Medical Corps
Temp Capt. Hugh Whatley Stevens Venn, West Kent Yeomanry
Lt. Edmund Vercoe, Royal Garrison Artillery
Maj. John Ellis Viccars  Leicestershire Regiment
Temp Maj. William Henry Vickress  Royal Army Service Corps
Lt. Thomas Whitehaire Vigers  Royal Engineers
Temp Maj. Sydney Vincent, Labour Corps
Lt. Arthur Cyril Waddy, Royal Field Artillery
Capt. Douglas Wain
Lt. Edwin Moira Wainwright, Royal Munster Fusiliers
Temp Capt. Edward McAllen Walker, Royal Field Artillery
Temp Lt. George Walker  Royal Engineers
Maj. John Douglas Glen Walker  Royal Highlanders
Maj. Forbes Thompson Wallace, Royal Highlanders
Temp Maj. Edgar Hardress Waller, Royal Army Service Corps
Temp Capt. William Arnold Wallinger
Temp Capt. Charles Wilmot Wanklyn-James, Royal Army Medical Corps
Temp Lt. David Bruce Warren
Temp Lt. Philip Ridedale Warren, Royal Engineers
Capt. William Robert Vaughton Warren  Royal Army Service Corps
Maj. Walter James Waters, Royal Army Medical Corps
Temp Capt. Ernest Alfred William Watney  
Capt. Forrester Colvin Watson  3rd Hussars
Temp Capt. William Frank Watson, Royal Army Service Corps
Lt. James Percy Wattleworth, Royal Field Artillery
Lt.-Col. Lowther Watts, Liverpool Regiment
Temp Lt. Frank Goutts Webster, Royal Army Ordnance Corps
Temp Lt. Noel Edwin Webster  Nottinghamshire and Derbyshire Regiment
Capt. and Bt. Maj. Aubrey Pattisson Wallman Wedd, Royal Engineers
Capt. Robert Yaxley Weir, Lovat's Scouts
Quartermaster and Capt. Arthur George Wells  Royal Army Service Corps
Capt. and Bt. Maj. Charles Alexander Wells, Hampshire Regiment
Temp Capt. Frank William Wesley, Royal Army Medical Corps
Temp Capt. Reginald Granville Westmacott  
Temp Capt. Thomas Horatio Westmacott
Temp Lt. Henry Harold Wheatley  Royal Engineers
Temp Maj. Stanley White Whiffen, Royal Army Service Corps
Capt. Walter Kennedy Whigham, North Staffordshire Regiment
Maj. Charles Francis White, Royal Army Medical Corps
Maj. Edwin E. White, Royal Army Service Corps
Capt. George Gilmour White
Lt. John White, Royal Engineers
Capt. and Bt. Maj. Maurice FitzGibbon Grove-White  Royal Engineers
Temp Capt. Maurice Henry Whiting, Royal Army Medical Corps
Maj. Valentine George Whitla, 3rd Hussars
Quartermaster and Capt. John Wickersham, Royal Army Medical Corps
Maj. Henry William Cairns Wicks  Seaforth Highlanders
Temp 2nd Lt. Andrew James Widderson
Temp Lt. Raymond Wilkins, Royal Army Ordnance Corps
Capt. Kenneth Douglas Wilkinson, Royal Army Medical Corps
Temp Capt. Noel Read Ellershaw Wilkinson, Royal Army Service Corps
Temp Capt. Frank Stanley Wilks, Royal Army Service Corps
Temp Lt. Albert Henry Williams, Royal Army Ordnance Corps
Quartermaster and Capt. Alfred Edwin Williams
Maj. Archard Trevor Williams, Royal Army Service Corps
Lt. Frank Harry Williams  Royal Engineers
Lt. Henry Claude Williams, Royal Army Service Corps
Maj. Arthur Peere Williams-Freeman  Duke of Cornwall's Light Infantry
Capt. Archibald Wilson  Royal Army Medical Corps
Acting Maj. Arthur Ernest Wilson
Temp Capt. George Gatherer Wilson, Labour Corps
Temp Capt. John Alexander Wilson, Royal Army Medical Corps
Temp Maj. John Stewart Wilson, Royal Engineers
Rev. Piers Holt Wilson, Royal Army Chaplains' Department
Temp Capt. Stanley Brooke Winch, Royal Army Ordnance Corps
Maj. George Edward Windeatt, Devonshire Regiment
Temp Capt. Francis Arthur Winder, Royal Army Medical Corps
Temp Capt. Frederick Butwell Winfield, Royal Army Medical Corps
Temp Maj. Henry Philip Wolff, Labour Corps
Maj. and Bt. Lt.-Col. Walter Gordon Wolridge Gordon, Royal Highlanders
Temp Capt. George Jervis Wood
Temp Lt. James Henry Wood, Royal Army Ordnance Corps
Capt. John Edward Wood, West Riding Regiment
Capt. John Lawrence Wood, Royal Army Medical Corps
Minnie Wood  Sister-in-Charge, Queen Alexandra's Imperial Military Nursing Service
Temp Capt. William Lyon Wood, Royal Engineers
Lt. John Surry Woodger, Royal Army Service Corps
Temp Capt. Vivian John Woodward
Capt. Edward Saville Woolf, Royal Army Service Corps
Capt. Edward Wooll, Cheshire Yeomanry
Rev. Edward Percival Woollcombe, Royal Army Chaplains' Department
Temp Maj. Ivor William Woolley, Royal Army Service Corps
Temp Lt. Stanley Herbert Cunliffe Woolrych
Capt. and Maj. John Penry Garnons Worlledge, Royal Engineers
Temp Capt. Arthur John Wright, Royal Army Ordnance Corps
Capt. John Henry Wright, Royal Army Veterinary Corps
Lt. Charles Seymour Wright  Royal Engineers
Temp Maj. Ernest Trevor Langebear Wright  Royal Army Service Corps
Temp Maj. Travers Carey Wyatt, Royal Army Service Corps
Maj. Arthur St. John Yates  Royal Engineers
Temp Capt. John Henry Yates, Royal Army Veterinary Corps
Temp Capt. Henry Yellowlees, Royal Army Medical Corps
Rev. Erik Esskildsen Yelyerton, Royal Army Chaplains' Department
Lt. John Yorke, Royal Field Artillery
Rev. Stanislaus Dominic Young  Royal Army Chaplains' Department

Canadian Overseas Forces
Quartermaster and Hon Capt. Thomas Stuart Acheson, Manitoba Regiment
Maj. Kay Alexander, Canadian Railway Troops
Capt. Jesse Allen, Canadian Infantry
Maj. John Douglas Armour, Canadian Artillery
Maj. John Clements Ball  Canadian Artillery
Lt.-Col. Allan Edward Kingston Bennett, Canadian Army Medical Corps
Capt. James Bdssett, Canadian Army Service Corps
Maj. Wilfred Bovy, Canadian Infantry
Capt. Edmund Albert Burke, Quebec Regiment
Maj. Leslie dement Carey, Alberta Regiment
Hon Capt. William Carroll  Ch.D
Maj. Eric James Church, Canadian Army Service Corps
Maj. John George Cline, Canadian Machine Gun Corps
Capt. Cyril Prichard Colville, Canadian Army Pay Corps
Maj. Henry Sloane Cooper  Central Ontario Regiment
Maj. Frederic Joseph Delaute, Quebec Regiment
Capt. Joseph Rene Jacques Duhault, Canadian Army Veterinary Corps
Lt.-Col. Archibald Earchinan  Canadian Railway Troops
Maj. Arthur William Mickle Ellis, Canadian Army Medical Corps
Capt. Cyril Woodland Erlebach, British Columbia Regiment
Lt.-Col. William Henry de la Tour d'Auvergne Findlay  Canadian Army Service Corps
Capt. Harold Bruce Findley, Canadian Army Dental Corps
Capt. Wilfred Josiah Finney, Canadian Field Artillery
Quartermaster and Hon Capt. Albert Percy Foster, British Columbia Regiment
Lt.-Col. Andrew Hamilton Gault  Princess Patricia's Canadian Light Infantry
Maj. George Reginald Geary, 58th Canadian Infantry Battalion
Capt. FitzRoy George, Quebec Regiment
Lt.-Col. William Waring Primrose Gibsone  Nova Scotia Regiment
Maj. Edward Montgomery Gordon, Canadian Army Service Corps
Capt. Vivien Horace Graham, Canadian Army Service Corps
Temp Maj. Thomas Hale, Canadian Forestry Corps
Temp Capt. Hermann Alfred Hardy, Canadian Army Service Corps
Capt. William Harty, Canadian Field Artillery
Capt. Harold Herbert, Saskatchewan Regiment
Temp Maj. Walter Herd, Canadian Forestry Corps
Maj. Basil Herbert John Irwin, Canadian Forestry Corps
Capt. John Gordon Jack, Canadian Army Service Corps
Maj. George Leslie Jennings,  Royal North West Mounted Police
Capt. Benjamin James Johnston, 49th Canadian Bm
Maj. Arthur Llewelyn Jones  Canadian Army Medical Corps
Maj. Lorne Fauntleroy Jones, Canadian Army Medical Corps
Lt.-Col. Hubert Kemmis Betty  Royal Canadian Regiment
Capt. Lucien Lacroix, Canadian Army Pay Corps
Capt. Arthur Henry Whittington Landon  Royal Canadian Regiment
Acting Capt. Gerald Ross Larkin, Canadian Army Service Corps
Maj. Archibald Brands Macaulay, Canadian Army Medical Corps
Rev. Arthur Huffman McGreer  Canadian Army Chaplains' Department
Capt. Donald McGugan  Manchester Regiment
Capt. Donald Morrison MacKay, Canadian Army Ordnance Corps
Lt.-Col. John William Herbert McKinery  Quebec Regiment
Capt. Cecil Gordon Mackinnon, Canadian Army Service Corps
Capt. William Hamilton McMurray  Canadian Engineers
Temp Maj. James Howard McNeil, Canadian Forestry Corps
Capt. William Wright Main, 1st Canadian Motor Machine Gun Corps
Quartermaster and Hon Capt. Harry A. Marshall, Canadian Army Medical Corps
Capt. JamesFrederick Stewart Marshal  Canadian Army Medical Corps
Capt. Herbert Walter Martin, Canadian Army Medical Corps
Maj. Douglas Herbert Campbell Mason  Central Ontario Regiment
Capt. Robert Gordon Mathews, Canadian Army Pay Corps
Maj. Ernest Wallace Mermagen, Manchester Regiment
Temp Capt. Arthur William Morton, Canadian Army Service Corps
Rev. John Joseph O'Gorman, Canadian Army Chaplains' Department
Capt. Richard Benjamin O'Sullivan, Canadian Army Pay Corps
Maj. James Grannis Parmelee, Canadian Army Service Corps
Capt. James Burleigh Pattullo, Canadian Army Pay Corps
Capt. Gilbert Livennore Pearson, Canadian Army Pay Corps
Temp Maj. David Philpot  7th Canadian Infantry Battalion
Capt. Marvin James Preston, Canadian Army Veterinary Corps
Lt. Kenneth Allan Ramsay  Canadian Engineers
Lt.-Col. Clifford Hamilton Reason  Canadian Army Medical Corps
Temp Lt. William John Duane Reed-Lewis, Canadian Railway Troops
Capt. Frederick Richardson, Manchester Regiment
Capt. William Augustus Richardson, Canadian Army Medical Corps
Maj. James Richardson Roaf, Canadian Engineers
Maj. Russell Butler Robertson, Canadian Army Medical Corps
Rev. Allan Shatford, Canadian Army Chaplains' Department
Maj. Richard Stephenson Smith, Canadian Engineers
Capt. Felix Musgrave Sowden, Canadian Army Service Corps
Capt. Bertram John William Spink, CanadianArmy Pay Department
Lt.-Col. Daniel William Bigelows Spry, Manchester Regiment
Maj. John Douglas Reginald Stewart, Alberta Regiment
Maj. Peter Donald Stewart, Canadian Army Medical Corps
Capt. James Still, Canadian Army Pay Corps
Maj. Samuel James Stredght, Canadian Army Medical Corps
Capt. John Leslie Sugden, Canadian Army Service Corps
Temp Lt.-Col. David Soley Tamblyn  Canadian Army Veterinary Corps
Maj. William John Taylor, Canadian Army Pay Corps
Capt. William Frederick Towill, Canadian Army Veterinary Corps
Capt. Thomas Kingsmill Wade, Canadian Army Service Corps
Quartermaster and Hon Capt. William Waldron, Canadian Forestry Corps
Quartermaster and Hon Capt. John Stanley Ward, Canadian Army Medical Corps
Capt. William Wilfred Worthington, 15th Canadian Battalion
Lt.-Col. Fred Armstrong Young, Canadian Army Medical Corps

Australian Imperial Forces
Capt. Charles Hubert Bath
Capt. George Bell, Australian Army Medical Corps
Maj. Ernest Gladstone Blanshard, Australian Army Pay Corps
Maj. Edward Harry Bushell, Australian Infantry
Capt. James Austin Chapman, Australian Infantry
Quartermaster and Hon Capt. Edward Henry Dike, 3rd Australia Pnr. Battalion, Australian Imperial Force
Capt. John William Farrar, Australian Army Medical Corps
Lt.-Col. Piers Fiaschi, Australian Army Medical Corps
Maj. Walker Arnold Le Roy Fry, Australian Imperial Force
Capt. Alexander McPhee Greenlees  A.E
Maj. John Leslie Hardie  
Capt. Charles Henry Harrison  Australian Imperial Force
Capt. Henry Coromandel Watsford Harrison, Australian Army Service Corps
Maj. Walter Jack, Australian Army Ordnance Corps
Maj. Edward Stewart James, Australian Army Veterinary Corps
Maj. Robert Kerr  Australian Army Service Corps
Maj. Frederick Donald Herbert Blois Lawton, Australian Army Medical Corps
Maj. Robert Hall Forman Macindoe, Australian Army Veterinary Corps
Lt.-Col. Charles Henry Ernest Manning  Australian Army Service Corps
Maj. Thomas Reginald Mellor, Australian Field Artillery
Lt. Roy Morrell  Australian Machine Gun Corps
Capt. Arnold Meredith Moulden, Australian Infantry
Maj. Hector Alexander Nugent  Australian Army Service Corps
Capt. Gordon Peters, Australian Infantry
Maj. Thomas Alfred Jack Playfair  Australian Field Artillery
Maj. Eric Clive Pegus Plant  Australian Infantry
Capt. Paul William Simonson, Australian Imperial Force
Lt.-Col. Valentine Osborne Stacy, Australian Army Medical Corps
Capt. Walter Ormond Stevenson, Australian Army Service Corps
Capt. Colin Quintrell Taplin, Australian Imperial Force
Capt. Frederick Usher John Tinkler  Australian Engineers
Capt. Harry Ortom Townsend, Australian Imperial Force
Capt. Henry Edward Trousselot, Australian Imperial Force
Capt. Herbert Ward Wilson  Australia Militia
Maj. Alexander Wynyard-Joss, Australian Army Service Corps

New Zealand Forces
Maj. Peter Maxwell Edgar, N.Z.V.C
Capt. Charles Ingram Gossage, NZ Army Ordnance Corps
Maj. George Rowland Hutchinson, NZ Army Service Corps
Maj. David McCurdy, Otago Mounted Rifles
Capt. Allan Stanley Muk, Wellington
Maj. Harold Avery Reid, N.Z.V.C
Maj. Hugh Vickerman  N.Z.R.E.

South African Forces
Temp Capt. Ernest Bowles  S.A.E.F
Quartermaster and Capt. Cecil Stevenson Cameron  SA Labour Corps
Lt. Frederick Collins  SA Engineers
Temp Lt.-Col. Joseph James Gheere Emmett, SA Nat. Labour Corps
Temp Lt.-Col. Alfred Fawcus, SA Nat. Labour Corps
Temp Capt. William Louis Geddes, SA Labour Corps
Maj. John James FitzGerald Harris, SA 
Temp Lt.-Col. Jan Jacobsz, SA Nat. Lab Corps
Rev John Lennox, SA Nat. Labour Corps
Capt. Henry Edmund Marshall, 1st Cape Coloured Lab Regiment
Temp Capt. Findlay McKay Ross  SA Engineers
Maj. Harper Sproule, 1st Cape Col. Lab Battalion
Lt.-Col. George Henry Usmar, SA Medical Corps

Newfoundland Overseas Forces
Temp Capt. Hector Roy McNeill, Newfoundland Regiment
Maj. William Grant Thomson, New Brunswick Regiment

For valuable services rendered in connection with military operations in Italy
Maj. Ronald Forbes Adam  Royal Field Artillery
Temp Capt. Guy Arthur Eustace Argles, Royal Army Service Corps
Maj. Clifford Allan Baily, Essex Regiment
Quartermaster and Capt. Owen King Belchem  Royal West Surrey Regiment
Temp Capt. Herbert Hillel Berlandina  Royal Engineers
Temp 2nd Lt. John Francis Bowen
Capt. Clive Kingsley Boyd, Royal Army Service Corps
Maj. Charles Bramhall, Royal Army Medical Corps
Temp Maj. Montagu Wilhelm Brown
Capt. Langley Browning  Royal Artillery
Temp Capt. Peter Burton Buckley  Royal Engineers
Rev. Richard Urban Butler, Royal Army Chaplains' Department
Temp Capt. Patrick Alphonsus Carroll, Royal Army Veterinary Corps
Maj. The Hon Arthur Claud Spencer Chichester  Irish Guards
Rev. Anthony William Chute, Royal Army Chaplains' Department
Capt. Myer Coplans  Royal Army Medical Corps
Maj. Joseph Curling, Royal Field Artillery
Lt. Moses Davids, Worcestershire Regiment
Temp Lt.-Col. Robert William Day  
Temp Maj. Louis Emmanuel Jean Guy de Savoie Carignan de Soissons
Temp Maj. Frederick Frank Dikon
Temp Capt. Richard Seymour Vivian Dyas 
Temp Maj. William Martin Evans  Royal Engineers
Temp Maj. FitzRoy Farquhar
Temp Capt. and Bt. Maj. Wallace Ferguson, Royal Engineers
Maj. James Forrest  late Lincolnshire Regiment
Capt. Francis Kerielm Foster, Gloucestershire Regiment
Temp Maj. Henry Edward Fulford, Royal Army Service Corps
Temp Lt. Gardner, George Herbert, Army Printing and Stationery Services
Temp Capt. Edward Alfred Gates, Royal Army Medical Corps
Maj. Thomas Holroyd Gibbon  Royal Army Medical Corps
Capt. Alan Keith Gibson  Oxfordshire and Buckinghamshire Light Infantry
Capt. John Galbraith Gill  Royal Army Medical Corps
Lt. Cyril Julian Goldsmid, 9th Lancers
Capt. Hugh Henry Grindley, Royal Field Artillery
Capt. George Herbert Grinsell, Royal Army Service Corps
Temp Capt. Archibald James Gwatkin
Temp Maj. Gordon Willis Hayter, Royal Army Service Corps
Maj. Alfred Scott Hewitt  Royal West Kent Regiment
Capt. James Joseph Hilliard, Royal Army Veterinary Corps
Temp Lt. Miles Staveley Hopkinson, Army Pay Department
Temp Capt. Sydney Charles Horton, Royal Army Service Corps
Rev. Randolph Hughes, Royal Army Chaplains' Department
Capt. George Noel Hunter, London Regiment
Temp Capt. John Duckworth Irving  West Yorkshire Regiment
Temp Capt. Harold Frank Ivory, Royal Army Service Corps
Temp Capt. John Jardine  Royal Army Medical Corps
Capt. Robert Hunter Jeff, East Yorkshire Regiment
Lt. Augustine Henry Keenan  Royal Highlanders
Temp Maj. Harold Kenworthy, Royal Engineers
Temp Maj. Neville Leese  Royal Army Service Corps
Capt. The Hon Piers Walter Legh, Grenadier Guards
Temp Capt. Algernon George Le Mesurier
Temp Maj. Lewis Richard Lipsett, Royal Army Service Corps
Maj. Sydney Joseph Lowe  Royal Fusiliers
Temp Capt. Reginald Hutchinson Lucas  Royal Army Medical Corps
Rev. Robert James McCliment, Royal Army Chaplains' Department
Capt. William John Richardson Matthews, Manchester Regiment
Capt. Charles Mitchell  Grenadier Guards
Capt. and Bt. Maj. Edwin Logie Morris  Royal Engineers
Rev. Thomas Carlyle Murphy, Royal Army Chaplains' Department
Temp Lt. Leslie Cuthbert Newton, Royal Army Ordnance Corps
Temp Capt. Charles Carlyon Nicholl, Royal Army Service Corps
Temp Capt. Reginald Frank Parker  
Temp Capt. William Ashley Parkes, Royal Army Service Corps
Temp Capt. Charles Kendall Phillips
Quartermaster and Capt. Harry Plews, Royal Sussex Regiment
Capt. Benjamin Henry Potter  Royal Garrison Artillery
Temp Maj. Eugene Ramsden
Capt. William Henry Rean, Royal Engineers
Maj. Arthur George Rolleston, Royal Field Artillery
Lt. Leonard James Sarjeant
Capt. Frank Arthur Sclater  Royal Engineers
Rev. Henry George Hastings Shaddick, Royal Army Chaplains' Department
Maj. and Bt. Lt.-Col. George Edward Sharp, Army Pay Department
Temp Capt. Edgar Leonard Shoetensack, Royal Army Ordnance Corps
Maj. Humphrey Etwall Smyth  Royal Army Ordnance Corps
Temp Capt. Ethelbert Ambrook Southee, Royal Army Service Corps
Temp Maj. George Stretton Spurrier  Royal Army Service Corps
Lt. Cyril Ernest Stearns, King's Royal Rifle Corps
Lt. Arthur Gerard Rhodes Sentance Tapp  Royal Field Artillery
Temp Capt. Trevor Meredytih Chatty Thomas  Suffolk Regiment
Capt. John Arthur Stuart Tillard  Royal Engineers
Temp Capt. Walter Frederick Wackrill, Royal Engineers
Capt. John Clive Williams, Royal West Surrey Regiment
Temp Capt. Arnot Milne Wilson, Royal Army Service Corps
Lt.-Col. Hubert Malcolm Wilson  Cheshire Yeomanry
Capt. Richard Guy Cecil Yerburgh, Irish Guards

For valuable services rendered in connection with military operations in German South West Africa
Col. Arthur Willie Cumming, 18th Mounted Rifles
Maj. William Jan Klerck, 4th Mounted Brigade
Lt.-Col. Andries Langebrink, Union Reserve of Officers
Maj. Richard Granville Nicholson, 3rd Mounted Brigade

For valuable services rendered in connection with military operations in Mesopotamia
Capt. Robert Edward Alderman  Indian Army Reserve of Officers
Maj. William Rex Ames, 1/4th Rajputs, Indian Army
Maj. Claud John Eyre Auchinleck  62nd Punjabis, Indian Army
Temp Maj. Edward Leonard Bagshawe  Royal Engineers
Capt. George Charles Bampfield, 90th Punjabis, Indian Army
Maj. Allen Gilbert Bartholomew, Middlesex Regiment
Lt. Alec Jeffrey Bell, Indian Army Reserve of Officers
Capt. Herbert Bell, Royal Engineers
Lt. George Bispham  Indian Army Reserve of Officers
Capt. Henry Blackwell, 106th Hazara Pioneers
Capt. Arthur Locke Blake, Somerset Light Infantry
Sister Nellie Blew  Queen Alexandra's Imperial Military Nursing Service
Maj. John Body  East Kent Regiment
Lt.-Col. Walter Fitzgerald Bourne, Royal Jat Light Infantry, Indian Army
Lt. Percy Brooke Bramley  Indian Army Reserve of Officers
Temp Lt. Sydney Haynes Bridcut, Royal Engineers
Capt. Robert Norman Dymoke Broad, 5th Gurkha Rifles,  Indian Army Reserve of Officers
Maj. Thomas Fleetwood Brook, Supply and Transport Corps, Indian Army
Temp Capt. James Hardy Brown  
Temp Lt. John Bayley Fairfax Brown, Royal Engineers
Lt. Denis Robert Howe Browne, Indian Army Reserve of Officers
Rev. Ernest Graham Brownrigg  Royal Army Chaplains' Department
Capt. Alexander Henderson Burn, 59th Scinde Rifles,  Indian Army
Temp Capt. William George Burn, Royal Engineers
Maj. Christopher Wyndowe Bushell, Royal Engineers
Temp Capt. Joseph Aloysius Callaghan, South Lancashire Regiment
Capt. John Maurice Hardman Campbell, Royal Army Medical Corps
Temp Lt. Arthur Frederick Neale Chandler, Royal Army Ordnance Corps
Temp Quartermaster and Capt. Joseph James Christie
Lt. Arthur John Clarke  Norfolk Regiment
Temp Capt. Aubrey Martin Clarke, Gloucestershire Regiment
Maj. Richard Charles Clarke  Supply and Transport Corps, Indian Army
Capt. Reginald Ernest Coleman, Middlesex Regiment
Maj. Percy Lovel Coleridge, 1/80th Carnatic Infantry, Indian Army
Capt. Williams Corner, Royal Army Medical Corps
Maj. Hamilton Maxwell Cruddas  Indian Medical Service
Lt.-Col. Robert John Coming  148th Pioneers, Indian Army
Capt. and Bt. Maj. Arthur Marston Daniels, 3rd Skinner's Horse, Indian Army
Lt. John Davidson, Supply and Transport Corps, Indian Army Reserve of Officers
Lt. William Davisi, Supply and Transport Corps, Indian Army Reserve of Officers
Department Commander and Hon Capt. Frank Donald Dawson, I. Misc. List
Maj. Guy Tullock Dennys, 31st Punjabis, Indian Army
Temp Capt. Albert Henry Frederick De Woolfson, Royal Engineers
Capt. William Barnard Drake, South Wales Borderers
Capt. Francis Grenville Drew, Royal Engineers
Capt. and Bt. Maj. Leslie Dunbar  Royal Army Medical Corps
Maj. and Bt. Lt.-Col. Patrick Henry Dundas  Royal Jat Light Infantry, Indian Army
Capt. Wilfred James Dunri, Royal Army Medical Corps
Rev. William Alexander Dunnett, Royal Army Chaplains' Department
Maj. Harold Exham, 7th Gurkha Rifles, Indian Army
Maj. Lionel Arthur Fanshawo  Royal Artillery
Maj. Edward Stanton Henry Ferry, 22nd Bengal and N.W. Railway, Indian Army
Capt. Cecil James Fisher  Middlesex Regiment
Capt. Arthur Fitzgerald, Supply and Transport Corps, Indian Army
Capt. Hugh Lidwell Flack, Royal Army Service Corps
Capt. Cyril Flowers, Royal Field Artillery
Lt.-Col. John George Foster  Royal Army Medical Corps
Lt.-Col. Francis Edward Fremantle, Royal Army Medical Corps
Capt. Herbert Leslie Garson  Royal Army Medical Corps
Lt. Eric Norman Goddard, 107th Pioneers, Indian Army
Capt. and Bt. Maj. Alfred Rmde Godwin-Austen  South Wales Borderers
Capt. Frederic Lawrence Gore, 113th Infantry, Indian Army
Maj. Glynn Grylls, Royal Artillery
Lt. Reuben Henry Gwyn-Williams  Royal Welsh Fusiliers
Temp Capt. Henry Clement Hadrill, Royal Army Service Corps
Temp Maj. Leonard Joseph Hall, Royal Engineers
Capt. Sidney Lewis Hall, Royal Field Artillery
Capt. Kenneth O'Brien Harding, Indian Army
Temp Capt. Archibald John Harris, Royal Engineers
Maj. Adair Colpoys Hoslop  Royal Garrison Artillery
Rev. Hamilton Dunston Henderson, Royal Army Chaplains' Department
Capt. Frank Higson, Norfolk Regiment
Capt. Morton Biles, Wiltshire Regiment
Rev. Richard Senior Hipwell, Royal Army Chaplains' Department
Rev. Edmund Joseph Hobson, Royal Army Chaplains' Department
Maj. Reginald Thomas Keble Hodge, Duke of Cornwall's Light Infantry
Capt. Henry Porter Wolseley Hutson  Royal Engineers
Maj. Charles Robert Ingram  Royal West Kent Regiment
Quartermaster and Capt. Charles Herbert Inwood  Worcestershire Regiment
Rev. Percival Walter James, Royal Army Chaplains' Department
Lt. Oswald Duke Jarvis  Royal Army Medical Corps
Capt. Jordan Constantino John  Indian Medical Service
Capt. Charles Grey Peyton Jones, Royal Garrison Artillery
Temp Capt. Sydney Herbert Jones
Maj. and Bt. Lt.-Col. Charles Kirkpatrick, Corps of Guides, Indian Army
Capt. George Henry Knowland, Indian Army
Capt. Cecil John Rhodes Lawrence, Royal Army Veterinary Corps
Temp Capt. Kenneth Lightfoot, Royal Engineers
Capt. Donald Hector Colin MacArthur  Royal Army Medical Corps
Lt. William MacDermott, Royal Horse Artillery
Temp Lt. Ian Thomas Aliston MacDonald, Royal Army Service Corps
Capt. Nioll Austin MacGurk, Indian Army Reserve of Officers
Capt. Edwin Gray MacHutchon, Royal Engineers
Temp Capt. Archibald MacMillan, Royal Army Medical Corps
Capt. and Bt. Maj. William McNaughtan  Royal Army Medical Corps
Rev. Duncan Gordon MacPherson, Royal Army Chaplains' Department
Rev. Joihn Mainwaring, Royal Army Chaplains' Department
Capt. Robert Wardlaw Manderson, 3rd Skinner's Horse
Lt. Hugh Marr  South Wales Borderers
Temp Capt. Donald James Marriott, Royal Engineers
Maj. Percy Alexander Maxwell, 1st Brahmans, Indian Army
Temp Capt. Archibald Thomas Miller, Machine Gun Corps
2nd Lt. John Alfred Tennant Miller, 14th Hussars
Temp Maj. Thomas Maxwell Stuart Milne-Henderson, Royal Engineers
Capt. and Bt. Maj. Valentine Elkin Mocatta, 14th Hussars
Capt. John Barre de Winton Molony  Indian Medical Service
Rev. John Patrick Molony  Royal Army Chaplains' Department
Maj. Joseph Rando M. Mullings, Royal Field Artillery
Maj. Edward Brodie Munro  Indian Medical Service
Temp Capt. Stuart Murray, Royal Army Medical Corps
Temp Quartermaster and Capt. Harry Edwin Newton Niblett  
Capt. Earle McKillop Nicholl, Royal Army Veterinary Corps
Capt. Reginald Latham Nicholls, Indian Army Reserve of Officers
Capt. Ralph Nield, Indian Army Reserve of Officers
Capt. Joseph O'Brien, Indian Army Reserve of Officers
Lt.-Col. Charles William O'Bryen, Indian Army
Maj. Charles William Gustavis Palmer, Hampshire Regiment
Rev. William Robert Park  Royal Army Chaplains' Department
Temp Maj. Edwin Charles Lewis Parker, Royal Army Service Corps
Hon Maj. Henry Pepper, Misc. List, Indian Army
Temp Maj. Percy Gwynedd Porteous, Royal Engineers
Capt. Jack Mervyn Pritchard, Royal West Kent Regiment
Temp Maj. Arthur Havard Protheroe  Royal Army Service Corps
Quartermaster and Capt. Ernest John Ward Reader, Royal West Surrey Regiment
Capt. Henry Gordon Redman, Wiltshire Regiment
Lt. George Stanley Reed  Indian Army Reserve of Officers
Maj. Walter Clarke Reid, 32nd Lancers, Indian Army
Temp Capt. Ernest Brayley Reynolds, Royal Army Veterinary Corps
Capt. Percy Rothera, 29th South India Railway Battalion, Indian Army
Lt. Arthur Fitzgerald Rountree  Indian Army Reserve of Officers
Maj. Herbert Wynyard Rowlandson, 82nd Punjabis, Indian Army
Maj. Harry William Russell  Royal Army Medical Corps
Capt. Arthur Meyer Sassoon  13th Hussars
Temp Capt. Frank Greaves Sell wood, Royal Army Service Corps
Temp Maj. Ernest William Skinner, Royal Army Medical Corps
Lt. John Smith Sloper, Royal Army Medical Corps
Capt. Edward Percival Allman Smith  Royal Army Medical Corps
Capt. Donald Bradley Somerville, Middlesex Regiment
Capt. William Patrick Spens, Royal West Surrey Regiment
Maj. Harry Daniel Muhldoroff Stevenson  Supply and Transport Corps, Indian Army
Maj. William Archibald Stewart, Middlesex Regiment
Capt. Guy Stoddart, 104th Wellesley's Rifles, Indian Army
Lt. Hugh Gabriel Stokes, Indian Army Reserve of Officers
Maj. Alan Gething Stone  3rd Gurkha Rifles, Indian Army
Capt. Hugh Frederic Stoneham, East Surrey Regiment
Capt. Arthur Clifton  Royal Engineers Sykes
Maj. Maurice O'Connor  Royal Engineers Tandy
Temp Capt. Cedric Rowland Taylor  Royal Army Medical Corps
Maj. Thomas Temple, Royal Engineers
Temp Maj. Courtney Eleves Theobald, Royal Army Service Corps
Lt. Shirley John Montague Tuke, Royal Army Service Corps
Lt.-Commander Lionel Richard William Tusmell Turbett, Royal Indian Marines
Maj. Norman Dunbar Walker, Royal Army Medical Corps
Rev. Raymond Elliston Walker, Royal Army Chaplains' Department
Rev. Frank John Wilkey  Royal Army Chaplains' Department
Rev. Claude Bertram Warren, Royal Army Chaplains' Department
Maj. Charles Percival Fenwick Warton, Indian Army
Capt. William Linton Watson, Indian Medical Service
Capt. Godfrey de Vere Welchman, Royal Artillery
Maj. Cyril de Montfort Wellborne, Indian Army
Rev. Harold William Wheeler, Royal Army Chaplains' Department
Maj. Joseph Francis Whelan  Royal Army Medical Corps
Maj. Venion Northwood Whitamore, Indian Medical Service
Temp Capt. Talbot Hodwen Wheelwright
Capt. William Edward Rees Williams  Indian Medical Service
Senior Nursing Sister Jeanie Stewart Ramsay Wilson  Queen Alexandra's Imperial Military Nursing Service Reserve
Lt. Gerrard Napier Wilkinson, 1/39th Garhwal Rifles, Indian Army
Temp Capt. Geoffrey Wood  Cheshire Regiment
Capt. Geoffrey Bradford Worsdell, Yorkshire Regiment
Lt.-Col. Archibald Wyatt  Hampshire Regiment
Lt. Donald Russell Martin Yates  Indian Army Reserve of Officers

Australian Imperial Forces
Lt. Michael James Hillary  Australian Engineers
Maj. Samuel James White  Australian Engineers

South African Forces
Capt. Robert Charles Knight
Temp Capt. Hubert Steven Wakefield

For valuable services rendered in connection with military operations in North Russia (Archangel Command)
Capt. and Bt. Maj. Geoffrey Boutflower, Royal Army Service Corps
Capt. Edward Philip Carter, Royal Berkshire Regiment
Maj. Harry Llewellyn Cautley, Suffolk Regiment
Maj. Lewis Aubrey Coker, Royal Field Artillery
Maj. Alfred Walter Coxon, Army Pay Department
Maj. and Bt. Lt.-Col. Richard Parry Crawley  Royal Army Service Corps
Capt. Walter Criswell, Royal Engineers
Capt. George Croydon, Royal Garrison Artillery
Maj. Christian Frederick George William de Falbe, T.F. Res
Capt. Kingsley Dykes  
Capt. William Cunliffe Pickersgill Jay
Capt. William Nicol Watson Kennedy, Royal Army Medical Corps
Lt.-Col. Thomas McDermott, Royal Army Medical Corps
Temp Maj. Stanley Melbourne Mohr  Nottinghamshire and Derbyshire Regiment
Maj. Francis Moore  Royal Fusiliers
Quartermaster and Capt. John Alfred Mould
Temp Capt. Joseph Pitts   
Capt. John Sanderson Poole  King's Royal Rifle Corps
Temp Capt. William Carl Trorey Roeber, London Regiment
Capt. Robert Hunter Smith, Royal Army Service Corps
Temp Capt. George Backhouse Whitaker, Royal Engineers

Canadian Forces
Lt. Paul Hubert Mills, Canadian Field Artillery

For valuable services rendered in connection with military operations in North Russia (Murmansk Command)
Capt. Cecil Power Bellwood, Leicestershire Regiment
Quartermaster and Lt. Barnard Holmes, Royal Army Medical Corps
Temp Lt. James Wheatley Kilby, Royal Engineers
Lt. Robert Springett MacKilligin  Royal Engineers
Maj. Frank Gerald Guise Moores, Royal Army Service Corps
Temp Lt. Arthur Field Nye, Army Pay Department
Temp Lt. Henry Albert Penn, Royal Army Ordnance Corps
Capt. John Renwick, Royal Army Medical Corps
Maj. Sir Ernest Henry Shackleton  
Capt. Sedley Fleming Campbell Sweeny, Royal Engineers

In recognition of distinguished services rendered during the War
Capt. Paul Adams
Capt. Sydney Wentworth Addison, Aus. P.O
Maj. Vaudrey Adolph Albrecht  Manchester Regiment
Maj. Rupert Darnley Anderson, R. Defence Cps
Maj. John Oliver Archer, Royal Field Artillery
Capt. William Bryan Armitage, Lancashire Fusiliers
Capt. John Eric Arrol-Hunter
Capt. William Ringrose Gelston Atkins
Capt. Charles Henry Awcock, Royal Garrison Artillery
Lt.-Col. John Eustace Arthur-Baldwin  8th Hussars
Capt. James Harvey Banks, Army Service Corps
Maj. George Deane Bateman
Capt. Philip Maurice Beachcroft, Royal Artillery
Lt.-Col. William Dawson Beatty, Royal Engineers
Maj. Victor Alexander Beaufort  Devonshire Regiment
Capt. Charles Hugh Bell
Capt. Andrew Belton, Royal Fusiliers
Capt. Harold Rothwell Bently, Cheshire Regiment
Chaplain Rev. Robert Seymour Brendon Berry
Maj. Percy Bishop 
Capt. John Dunbar Blyth
Lt.-Col. Carlos Bovill, Royal Artillery
Lt.-Col. The Hon Claude Maitland Patrick Brabazon, Irish Guards
Lt.-Col. Charles Raymond Strathern Bradley, Indian Army
Capt. John Stanley Travers Bradley, Machine Gun Corps
Lt.-Col. Edward Featherstone Briggs 
Maj. Horace Clowes Brinsmead  Australian Imperial Force
Capt. Edward James Briscoe
Maj. Reginald Vernon Charlesworth Brook
Maj. Percival Russell Burchall
Maj. Louis Arundell Burrowes, Middlesex Regiment
Capt. Vincent Buxton, Leicestershire Regiment
Lt.-Col., Charles Ferguson Campbell  Indian Army
Lt.-Col. Hugh Campbell  Royal Fusiliers
Capt. George Barrett Chainey
Lt.-Col. Arthur Henry Cheatle
Capt. Arthur James Child  London Regiment
Maj. Adrian John Clark, London Regiment
Maj. Henry Cockerell
Lt.-Col. Richard Hamilton Collier 
Capt. Leonard Barnaby Cook
Maj. Frederick Ernest Cooper
Maj. John Walter Cordingley
Capt. Leopold Harold Baskerville Cosway
Lt.-Col. Ivon Terence Courtney, Royal Marine Light Infantry
Lt.-Col. Alexander Duncan Cunningham
Maj. Maurice Ormonde Darby
Capt. John Hallmark Davies, Cheshire Regiment
Capt. Martin Deacon, Royal Engineers
Lt.-Col. Guy Cyril St. Pourgin de Dombasle, Canadian Forces
Lt.-Col. Harry Delacombe
Capt. Ralph Busick Claude Marie Tyrel de Poix, Norfolk Regiment
Maj. James Dickson, SA Engineers
Maj. John Edward Dixon Spain, Hampshire Regiment
Maj. Gerald Dixpn-Spain  Royal Fusiliers
Capt. Geoffrey William Dobson, 19th Hussars
Capt. Maurice Rowland Dobson  Royal Army Medical Corps
Maj. James Frederick Dyer, East Lancashire Regiment
Capt. Alban Spenser Ellerton
Maj. Audrey Thomas Evans
Capt. William Sandford Evans, Welsh Regiment
Capt. Reginald Marsh Everett
Maj. George Ferdinand Hay Faithful, Indian Army
Maj. Reuben Llewelyn Farley, Cavly. Res
Lt.-Col. William Samuel Fetherstonhaugh, Canadian Forestry Corps
Maj. Samuel John Vincent Fill
Maj. Hubert Frank Fisher
Capt. Harry Gilbert Ford
Capt. Guy Langham Godden
Maj. Richard Ernest Goddard
Maj. Harry Francis Adam Gordon, York and Lancaster Regiment
Maj. James William Gordon
Lt.-Col. Edward Hugh Griffith, Leicestershire Regiment
Capt. Gerald Gude
Maj. Robert Hall 
Capt. William Wellington Hall
Col. Rev. Robert Edward Vernon Hanson  Chaplain-in-Chief
Maj. William Bowen Hargrave, Suffolk Regiment
Capt. Edward St. Clair Harnett, Royal Highlanders
Maj. Cuthbert Alfred Lakin Harrison
Maj. Allan Pickup Hartley, Cheshire Regiment
Capt. Francis Henry Hawksford
Maj. Edward Michael William Hearn
Lt.-Col. Sacheverell Arthur Hebden
Capt. Francis Edgcombe Hellyer, Hampshire Regiment
Maj. Clement Henry Armitage Hirtzel
Maj. Archibald Henry Hogarth  Royal Army Medical Corps
Maj. George Edward Woods Humphery
Capt. Albert Hunter, West Riding Regiment
Capt. Douglas Iron
Capt. Dennis Cory James, Worcestershire Regiment
Lt.-Col. Frederick Howard Jenkins 
Capt. John Fleming Jones 
Maj. William Dallas Looey Jupp
Capt. Michael Keegan  Royal Dublin Fusiliers
Lt.-Col. Frank Howard Kirlby  Royal Engineers
Capt. William Clement Lambert, Notts Yeomanry
Lt.-Col. Joseph Herbert Arthur Landon 
Capt. Pierre Alfred Landry, Canadian Infantry
Maj. Cecil Edward Lawder, Royal Field Artillery
Maj. Arthur Raymond Layard
Capt. Francis William Henry Lerwill, Royal Engineers
Maj. Albert Levick, Grenadier Guards
Capt. Oskar Lindquist
Capt. Peter Douglas Liorne Lyall, Canadian Forestry Corps
Maj. Oswyn George William Clifford Lywooi, Norfolk Regiment
Maj. Alfred Erasmus Geoffrey Macfullum, Intell. Corps
Capt. Kenneth Hugh McLean 
Capt. Thomae MacLeod
Maj. Guy Montagu George, Viscount Maidstone 
Capt. Reginald Baynes Mansell, Gloucestershire Regiment
Capt. Philip Gadsby, A.O.D
Capt. Harry Prcy Maybury
Maj. Albert Edgar Gendle
Capt. David Goad Herbert Arthur Michell
Capt. Allister Mackintosh Miller 
Hon Capt. Hugh Milman, Royal Engineers
Capt. Richard Gaibraith Mitchell, Royal Scots
Maj. Rowland Money, Royal Lancaster Regiment
Capt. Errol Francis Monk
Capt. Arthur Thomas Moore
Maj. Denzil Adair Bartlett Morle
Lt.-Col. Lewis Munro, Hampshire Regiment
Maj. Arthur Lawrence Cecil Neame, Royal Engineers
Capt. Christopher George Nevatt
Maj. Hazleton Robson Nicholl
Capt. John MacArthur Nicolle
Capt. Sydney Nixon
Lt. Col. Douglas Austin Oliver 
Capt. Leonard Edgcombe Palmer, York and Lancaster Regiment
Maj. Charles Herbert Parkes
Maj. Sydney Charles Parr
Maj. Richard Hallam Peck, East Surrey Regiment
Lt.-Col. William Henry Pope
Maj. Eric Walter Powell
Asst. Conductor Lucy Marjorie Kathleen Pratt-Barlow 
Capt. John Edward Haddock Pritchard
Maj. Walter John Dakyns Pryce  Gordon Highlanders
Capt. Charles Francis Rasmusen
Maj. Geoffrey Jervis Read, North Staffordshire Regiment
Lt.-Col. Lionel Wilmot Brabazon Rees  Royal Garrison Artillery
Capt. Thomas Stanley Rippon, Royal Army Medical Corps
Lt.-Col. Charles Maclver Robertson, Royal Field Artillery
Maj. Hector Murdoch Maxwell Robertson  Royal Field Artillery
Lt.-Col. Richard Stirling Robinson
Lt.-Col. Nelson Roche
Maj. James Theodore Rodwell
Capt. Samuel Greenlees Rome  Argyll and Sutherland Highlanders
Capt. Andrew Alexander Ross
Lt.-Col. Alexander Ross-Hume, Scottish Rifles
Maj. The Hon Victor Alexander Frederick Villiers Russell, Bedfordshire Regiment
Maj. Felix Rumney Samson
Capt. Ernest Selby
Maj. John Percy Claude Sewell
Capt. Harry Turner Shaw
Maj. Arthur Frederick Sidgreaves
Maj. George Edward Smith, East Yorkshire Regiment
Capt. James Drummond Smith
Maj. Sydney William Smith, Royal Artillery
Capt. William Edwin Smith
Capt. Geoffrey Somers-Clarke
Capt. Douglas Charles Leyland Speed, King's Royal Rifle Corps
Capt. Frank Steel, Essex Regiment
Maj. John Valentine Steel, Royal Engineers
Capt. Frank Douglas Stevens, Machine Gun Corps
Capt. George Stevens
Capt. Jack Stewart, Royal Scots Fusiliers
Capt. Alfred Hugh Stradling, Gordon Highlanders
Lt.-Col. Lawrence Hugh Strain 
Capt. Howard Wallace Stratton, 6th Dragoon Guards
Capt. Lionel Michael Patrick Sulivan, Royal Engineers
Maj. George Henry Thomson
Lt.-Col. George Eardley Todd, Welsh Regiment
Maj. Henry Carmichael Tweedie  North Staffordshire Regiment 
Maj. Frederick Henry Unwin
Lt.-Col. Reynell Henry Verney
Capt. William James Waddingixm, Grenadier Guards
Capt. William Wade, Middlesex Regiment
Capt. Howard Napier Walker  Welsh Regiment
Lt.-Col. Alexander Thomas Watson, Nigeria Regiment
Maj. George William Williamson  Manchester Regiment
Capt. Henry Alexander James Wilson
Maj. Aubrey Brooke Winch, Royal Scots Greys
Capt. Cuthbert Walter Wise  Army Service Corps
Maj. Thomas Worswick
Capt. Hugh Edmund Fowler Wynooll  Nottinghamshire and Derbyshire Regiment
Maj. Henry Irving Frederick Yates 
Capt. Charles Fredsall Yeomans
Capt. Andrew Young

In recognition of valuable services rendered in connection with the War 

 Maj. Harold Blumfield Brown, Royal Garrison Artillery (TF)

In recognition of services in connection with the War
Royal Navy
Acting Chaplain the Rev. Bernard James Failes 
Chaplain the Rev. Francis Horace Jones 
Acting Chaplain the Rev. Henry Swing Kendall 
Acting Chaplain the Rev. Norman Braund Kent 
Chaplain the Rev. Walter Kenrick Knight-Adkin 
Acting Chaplain the Rev. Horace Ricardo Wilkinson

Army
Temp Lt. Charles Anthony Ablett, Royal Engineers
Capt. Adolphe Abrahams, Royal Army Medical Corps
Maj. Thomas George Acres
Temp Capt. John Cadwallader Adams
Lt.-Col. Joseph Saunders Addenbrooke, Royal Engineers
Maj. Michael David Ahern, Royal Army Medical Corps
Maj. Denis Aherne, Royal Horse Artillery
Maj. Arthur Charles Bridgeman Alexander, late Seaforth Highlanders
Maj. Edward Watts Allen, Royal Army Service Corps
Maj. and Bt. Lt.-Col. Atwell Hayes Allen, Royal Army Ordnance Corps
Capt. John Stirling Alston, King's Royal Rifle Corps
Lt.-Col. William Albert Alwood, Royal Army Ordnance Corps
Capt. Cecil Henry Anderson-Pelham, Rem. Services
Temp Maj. John Samuel Anderson, Army Pay Department
Maj. Frederick William Aridrewes  Royal Army Medical Corps
Maj. George Crossley Appleyard, Royal Artillery
Capt. and Bt. Maj. Malcolm Alexander Arbuthnot, Seaforth Highlanders
Rev. Mervyn Archdale, Royal Army Chaplains' Department
Maj. Samuel Frank Alderson Archer, Royal Artillery
Capt. and Bt. Maj. Charles Leathley Armitage  Worcestershire Regiment
Maj. James Alexander Armstrong, Royal Inniskilling Fusiliers
Capt. Edward Whinstone Arnott, Royal Field Artillery
Temp Lt.-Col. Herbert George Ashwell, Royal Army Medical Corps
Lt.-Col. Hugh Harry Haworth Aspinall, Indian Army
Temp Maj. Charles Atherton Atchley, Royal Engineers
Lt.-Col. George Bramall Atherton, Royal Army Service Corps
Maj. Edward William Atkinson  Royal Inniskilling Fusiliers
Temp Maj. Anthony William Maunsell Atthill  Royal Army Service Corps
Capt. Samuel James Manson Auld  Royal Berkshire Regiment
Lt.-Col. Bill Auld, Labour Corps
Maj. and Bt. Lt.-Col. George Henry Badcock, Rem. Service, late Indian Army
Temp Maj. Arthur Henry Bagnall
Lt. Richard Dayrell Banall
Temp Maj. Arthur Charles Bailey, Royal Engineers
Maj. Percy James Bailey  12th Lancers
Maj. Frederick Guy Stirling Baker, Essex Regiment
Lt.-Col. William Henry Baker-Baker, Northumberland Volunteer Corps
Maj. Henry Barchard Fenwick Baker-Carr, Argyll and Sutherland Highlanders
Maj. Edward William Sturgis Balfour  5th Dragoon Guards
Lt. Hon James Moncrieff Balfour, Scottish Horse Yeomanry
Capt. Alexander Douglas Ball
Temp Capt. Walter Craven Ball, Royal Engineers
Maj. David Ballantyne, Royal Scots
Lt.-Col. Percy Bamford  Manchester Regiment
Temp Lt. Col. Gilbert Alexander Bannatyne  Royal Army Medical Corps
Lt.-Col. Thomas Foster Barham, Somerset Volunteer Corps
Temp Capt. Hon Hugo Baring
Maj. Charles Robert Barkshire, Staff for Royal Engineers Service
Temp Capt. and Bt. Maj. Neil MacKechnie Barren, Royal Engineers
Hon Lt.-Col. William Barker Bartholomew, Staff for Royal Engineers Service
Rev. Reginald Bartlett, Royal Army Chaplains' Department
Quartermaster and Maj. William Bass
Maj. Francis Marshall Bassett, Bedfordshire Regiment
Maj. John Retallack Bassett  Royal Berkshire Regiment
Lt.-Col. William Edmund Pollexfen Bastard, Royal Engineers
Temp Capt. George William Hyde Batho, late Royal Garrison Artillery
Lt.-Col. Herbert Cary George Batten, City of Bristol Volunteer Corps
Maj. Abington Robert Bayley, Royal Field Artillery
Maj. and Bt. Lt.-Col. Douglas Dyneley Baynes, Labour Corps
Maj. William Lear Beales, Royal Inniskilling Fusiliers
Temp Capt. William Robert de la Cour Beamish, Royal Engineers
Temp Maj. Myddelton Beasley, Royal Engineers
Temp Maj. Eugene Guy Euston Beaumont, Royal Army Service Corps
Capt. and Bt. Maj. Claude Eagles Willoughby Beddoes, Gloucestershire Regiment
Maj. and Hon Lt.-Col. Henry Howard Bedingfield, late Devonshire Regiment
Lt.-Col. Henry Begbey, Royal Army Ordnance Corps
Temp Capt. Edgar Charles Behrens, Royal Army Service Corps
Temp Maj. Charles Francis Bell  Royal Army Service Corps
Maj. Clive Vincent Moberley Bell, North Lancashire Regiment
Temp Maj. George Gerald Bell, Royal Engineers
Lt.-Col. Andrew Bell-Irving  late Royal Artillery
Temp Maj. James Bennett, Royal Army Service Corps
Maj. Joseph Benskin  Royal Engineers
Maj. and Bt. Lt.-Col. Ralph Hawtrey Rohde Benson, Royal Artillery
Lt.-Col. Robert Marr Benzie  Scottish Rifles
Maj. John dela Poer Beresford, Royal Berkshire Regiment
Temp Capt. Peter Bergheim  Royal Garrison Artillery
Maj. Rupert Edric Gifford Berkeley, Indian Army
Maj. and Bt. Lt.-Col. John Bernard, Royal Army Service Corps
Rev. Stewart Frederick Lewis Bernays, Royal Army Chaplains' Department
Maj. John Borrow, 19th Hussars
Lt.-Col. Henry Arthur Berryman, Royal Army Medical Corps
Maj. and Bt. Lt.-Col. Charles Peter Berthon, East Yorkshire Regiment
Capt. Alfred Best  Lancashire Fusiliers
Lt. Samuel Beverley, Royal Artillery
Maj. and Bt. Lt.-Col. Charles William Biggs, Royal Engineers
Capt. William John How Bilderbeck, Army Pay Department
Lt.-Col. Sir Albert Edward Bingham  Royal Engineers
Lt.-Col. Steuart Murrey Binny, Army Pay Department
Maj. Lawrence Wilfred Bird  Royal Berkshire Regiment
Maj. Philip Austen Birkin, T.F. Res
Lt.-Col. Arthur Watson Birt, West Yorkshire Regiment
Temp Capt. Charles Alder Bishop, Royal Army Service Corps
Lt.-Col. Joseph George Bishop, Monmouthshire Regiment
Capt. Nathaniel Bishop
Maj. N. Black, Sing. Volunteer Corps
Capt. Thomas Blackburn, King's Own Scottish Borderers
Capt. Hew Francis Blair-Imrie  Royal Hussars
Temp Maj. Eustace William Blois, Rem. Service
Temp Maj. Wilmot Blomefield, Royal Engineers
Lt. Cuthbert Leigh Blundell-Hollinshead-Blundell, Grenadier Guards
Maj. and Bt. Lt.-Col. Kenneth Martin Body  Royal Army Ordnance Corps
Maj. and Bt. Lt.-Col. Robert Alfred Bolam  Royal Army Medical Corps
Quartermaster and Lt.-Col. Frank Bourne
Lt.-Col. Mansell Bowers, 5th Dragoon Guards
Temp Capt. Charles Bower Ismay
Lt.-Col. Ludlow Tonson Bowles, Royal Jersey Militia
Maj. Edward Langley Bowring  Worcestershire Regiment
Maj. Arthur Octavian Boyd, Royal Artillery
Temp Lt. Frederick Henry Ewart Branson  Royal Army Service Corps
Rev. Albert Edward Bray, Royal Army Chaplains' Department
Temp Maj. Richard Harding Bremridge  Royal Army Medical Corps
Capt. Arthur Brodie Hamilton Bridges, Royal Army Medical Corps
Lt.-Col. Edward James Bridges, Staff for Royal Engineers Service
Temp Capt. and Bt. Maj. James Leslie Brierly
Maj. and Bt. Col. George Ewbank Briggs, late Royal Fusiliers
Temp Capt. Charles John Brightman, Royal Army Service Corps
Lt. John Henry Brightman, London Regiment
Maj. Rowland Brinckman, Royal Irish Fusiliers
Temp Lt.-Col. Reginald Brittan  Nottinghamshire and Derbyshire Regiment
Temp Maj. William Albert Britten, Army Pay Department
Rev. John Brodie Brosman, Royal Army Chaplains' Department
Col. Arthur Rudston Brown  
Capt. Robert Cunyngham Brown, Royal Army Medical Corps
Temp Maj. Tom Bousquet Browne  Royal Army Service Corps
Maj. George Robert Bruce, Royal Army Medical Corps
Lt. George Herbert Buchannan, South Wales Borderers
Lt.-Col. Michael Rowland Gray Buchanan, Scottish Rifles
Lt.-Col. Sidney Carr Hobart-Hampden-Mercer-Henderson, Earl of Buckinghamshire, Oxfordshire and Buckinghamshire Light Infantry
Maj. Edward Buncombe Henry Buckley, Royal Garrison Artillery
Capt. and Temp Maj. Henry Stephen Guy Buckmaster, Oxfordshire and Buckinghamshire Light Infantry
Temp Maj. Lewis William Buffham, Royal Army Ordnance Corps
Temp Maj. Edward Griffiths George Burdon
Maj. Denis Joseph Gerard Burke, Duke of Cornwall's Light Infantry
Hon Lt.-Col. Montague Berthon Burnand, 3rd Suffolk Regiment
Capt. Richard Frank Burnand, Northumberland Fusiliers
Maj. and Bt. Lt.-Col. Frank Henry Burnell-Nugent  Rifle Brigade
Maj. Alexander Edwin Burnett, King's Own Scottish Borderers
Maj. John Chaplyn Burnett  
Maj. Leslie Trew Burnett, London Regiment
Maj. Harry William Geddes Burnett-Hitchcock, Royal Fusiliers
Capt. Charles William Wilberforce Burrell, Essex Regiment
Temp Maj. Edmund Gerald Burton, Royal Army Service Corps
Henrietta Burton  Matron, Queen Alexandra's Imperial Military Nursing Service Reserve
Capt. and Bt. Maj. Herbert Edgar Burton, Royal Engineers
Temp Maj. James Robert Bury-Barry
Maj. William Byam, Royal Army Medical Corps
Quartermaster and Capt. Richard Byrne  Royal Dublin Fusiliers
Rev. John Cairns, Royal Army Chaplains' Department
Lt. Arthur Campbell, Army Gymnastic Staff
Lt.-Col. Charles Campbell, 6th Cav., Indian Army
Maj. Arthur Edward Joseph Noel, Viscount Campden, Gloucestershire Regiment
Maj. Edward David Carden, Royal Engineers
Maj. Francis Gordon Cardew, Indian Army (ret.)
Lt.-Col. Thomas Carlyle, late Royal Army Ordnance Corps
Maj. Charles Cattley Carr 
Temp Capt. William Tom Carter, South Staffordshire Regiment
Temp Maj. Robert Jardine Carruthers, Royal Engineers
Temp Maj. Richard Bernard Cartwright, Army Pay Department
Maj. Louis Cassel
Temp Maj. Edward Postle Gwyn Causton, Royal Army Medical Corps
Temp Maj. Oswald Challis, Royal Army Medical Corps
Lt.-Col. Ernest Washington Chance, Bedfordshire Regiment
Maj. Maurice Chance, Bedfordshire Regiment
Temp Capt. Cecil John Golding Chandler, Royal Army Ordnance Corps
Maj. George James Chapman, Royal Engineers
Maj. Joseph Thomas Chapman, Royal Artillery
Lt.-Col. T. H. Chapman Ceylon Engineers
Lt.-Col. Frank Martin Chatterley  Royal Warwickshire Regiment
Maj. Thomas John Cheilew, Royal Garrison Artillery
Capt. Dennis Chesney, Worcestershire Regiment
Lt.-Col. Walter Raleigh Chichester, Worcestershire Regiment
Temp Capt. John Percy Chirnside  Rem. Service
Temp Lt.-Col. James Christie, Scottish Rifles
Capt. Harry Emory Chubb, Royal Army Service Corps
Maj. John Reginald Lopes Yarde-Buller, Lord Churston  Scots Guards
Col. Robert Clark 
Maj. Emilius Clayton, Royal Artillery
Capt. and Bt. Maj. Lionel Alfred Clemens  South Lancashire Regiment
Maj. Harry Clive, North Staffordshire Regiment
Capt. Ernest Hamilton Clifton
Maj. Henry Kenny Clough, Royal Lancaster Regiment
Quartermaster and Capt. Thomas Coates  Extra. Reg. Empld
Temp Maj. Walter George Cockburn, Royal Army Ordnance Corps
Lt.-Col. Thomas Henry Cochrane  Royal Engineers
Temp Capt. William Percy Cochrane  
Maj. and Bt. Lt.-Col. Herbert Adolphe Coddington  late Royal Irish Fusiliers
Lt.-Col. Thomas Everit Coleman, Staff for Royal Engineers Service
Maj. Sir Herbert Benjamin Cohen  Royal West Kent Regiment
Maj. Reginald Charles Coldwell, Northamptonshire Regiment
Lt.-Col. John Albert Cole, Lincolnshire Regiment
Maj. Mortimer Calmady Collier  Royal Army Service Corps
Temp Capt. Bertram James Collingwood, Royal Army Medical Corps
Maj. Charles Howell Groset Collins, Duke of Cornwall's Light Infantry
Rev. Edward Hycynth Collins, Royal Army Chaplains' Department
Temp Lt. Arthur Hugh Colquhoun, Royal Army Ordnance Corps
Lt.-Col. Charles Eliezer Colville  Royal Highlanders
Lt.-Col. Arthur Allen Collyer, Army Pay Department
Temp Maj. James Scarth Combe
Temp Maj. George Henry Edward Condon, Royal Engineers
Maj. Alfred Evelyn Coningham  Royal Engineers
Maj. Sidney George Cook, Huntingdonshire Cyclist Battalion
Maj. Martin Alfred Cooke, Royal Army Medical Corps
Lt.-Col. Philip Blencowe Cookson  Northumberland Hussars
Lt. Eustace Nugent-Fitzgeorge de Radcliffe Cooper  Royal Field Artillery
Temp Capt. George Alexander Conacher Cooper, Royal Engineers
Hon Maj. Harry Cooper, Royal Army Ordnance Corps
Lt.-Col. Martin Percy Corkery, Royal Army Medical Corps
Maj. Evan James Trevor Cory, Royal Army Medical Corps
Temp Capt. Sidney Herbert Court, Royal Engineers
Maj. John Cowan, Royal Engineers
Capt. John Cowling, London Regiment
Maj. Lionel Hired Cowper, Royal Lancaster Regiment
Lt. Horace Beresford Cox, Royal Garrison Artillery
Lt.-Col. Thomas Langhorne Coxhead  Royal Garrison Artillery
Capt. John Edward Crabbie, Royal Highlanders
Capt. Peter McLellan Cran, Royal Engineers (Special Reserve)
Temp Capt. Lucius Fairohild Crane
Maj. Robert Eugene Cran, North Lancashire Regiment (Special Reserve)
Lt. Albert Kenneth Graves Crater, East Surrey Regiment (Special Reserve)
Temp Lt.-Col. John Craven, South Lancashire Regiment
Maj. Charles Crawley, Royal Army Medical Corps
Lt.-Col. Edward Cottingliain Creagh, 57th Rifles, Indian Army
Maj. John Critchlow, Royal Engineers
Lt.-Col. Arthur Albert Crocker, Essex Regiment
Capt. Tom Croft
Lt.-Col. Cecil Crosskey  Royal Army Service Corps
Lt. Eric Crossley, 11th Hussars
Maj. Percy Hamilton Cruickshank, Royal Artillery
Capt. Eldon Annesley Crump, South Staffordshire Regiment
Maj. Cleland Buistrode Cumberlege  Bedfordshire Regiment
Maj. Ernest Nicholson Cunliffe  Royal Army Medical Corps
Lt.-Col. Frederick George Cunningham, East Yorkshire Regiment
Maj. Lewis Narborough Hughes D'Aeth, Staff
Temp Lt. Wilfred Gordon Beale Dailley, Royal Army Ordnance Corps
Maj. Claude Hecnry Dale, Royal Warwickshire Regiment
Temp Maj. Walter Daniel, Royal Engineers
Capt. Humphrey Averell Daniel, London Regiment
Lt.-Col. Edward Mashiter Dansey, late Life Guards
Maj. Henry Read Darley  Dragoon Guards
Maj. and Bt. Lt.-Col. George Bruce Dartnell, Royal Army Service Corps
Maj. Claude Daubuz  Royal Field Artillery
Maj. Edward Owen Davies, London Regiment
Capt. Bryant Fitzwilliam Richard Davis, Gloucestershire Regiment
Lt.-Col. Cecil Davis
2nd Lt. Sidney Alfred Davis  
Temp Lt. Col. William Richard Dawson, Royal Army Medical Corps
Quartermaster and Lt. William Herbert Davnes
Maj. Arthur Cecil Hamilton Dean 
Quartermaster and Capt. Waiter Nathan Dearnley, 1st Life Guards
Temp Maj. Frank Debenham, Oxfordshire and Buckinghamshire Light Infantry
Maj. Harold Alfred Denham, Liverpool Regiment
Temp Capt. John Dewar Denniston
Maj. William Alfred Charles Denny, Royal Army Service Corps
Temp Lt.-Col. Lewis Adolphus De Vic Carey
Temp Maj. James Devine, Royal Engineers
Temp Maj. James Arthur Devine  Royal Army Medical Corps
Lt.-Col. Henry des Voeux, Labour Corps
Lt. Michael Bruce Urquhart Dewar, Royal Engineers
Capt. Ferdinand De Witt, Royal Artillery
Maj. Sidhey Herbert Dewing, Norfolk Regiment
Quartermaster and Maj. Joseph Espin Dickinson, Royal Jersey Militia
Capt. Robert Milne Dickson  Royal Army Medical Corps
Capt. William Dickson, Royal Army Ordnance Corps
Temp Maj. Thomas Melville Dill, Bermuda Militia Artillery and Royal Garrison Artillery
Lt.-Col. Henry Peers Dimmock, Indian Medical Service
Temp Maj. Edward Dixon, Travers, Royal Artillery
Capt. and Bt. Maj. Andrew Edward Augustus Dobson, Royal Artillery
Temp Capt. George Shannon Dockrell
Temp Capt. Francis Sandford Dod, Royal Army Service Corps
Temp Maj. Herbert Frederick Doidge, Royal Army Service Corps
Maj. Claude Prendergast Doig  Seaforth Highlanders
Lt.-Col. George Frederick Doland
Maj. and Bt. Lt.-Col. William Dundas Dooner  Royal Army Ordnance Corps
Temp Capt. Percy William Dove  Royal Army Medical Corps
Maj. Halkett Walton Money Down, Army Pay Department
Lt.-Col. Henry John Downing  late Royal Irish Rifles
Lt.-Col. John Summers Drew, Middlesex Regiment
Maj. Tom Maxwell Drew, Leicestershire Regiment
Capt. Reginald Samuel Orme Dudfield, Royal Army Medical Corps
Temp Capt. Harold Ward Dudley, Royal Engineers
Temp Capt. Michael Louis Duffy, Royal Engineers
Maj. George Philip Du Plat Taylor, Grenadier Guards
Capt. Robert Charles Dunn, Lancashire Fusiliers
Quartermaster and Lt.-Col. John Samuel Dyke  late Royal West Surrey Regiment
Maj. Hugh Eardley-Wilmot, Devonshire Regiment
Temp Capt. Percy Eardiey-Wilmot
Temp Maj. Lewis Thomas Jerome Earp, Royal Army Ordnance Corps
Capt. B. J. Eaton, Malayan Volunteer Infantry
Maj. Lionel Charles Edwards, Royal Garrison Artillery
Maj. Albert Ebsmann, Royal Army Medical Corps
Temp Capt. Ernest Alfred Elgee
Maj. Stanley Elliott, London Regiment
Maj. RichardStanley Ellis  Royal Artillery
Capt. and Bt. Maj. Reginald Cheyne Elmslie  Royal Army Medical Corps
Lt.-Col. Herbert Averill Elton, Staffor Royal Engineers
Capt. William Rowe Eiworthy, Special Reserve
Capt. Ernest Arnold Emmet
Maj. and Bt. Lt.-Col. Evelyn Linzee Engleheart, late Royal Welsh Fusiliers
Hon Maj. Richard Travell England
Maj. William English, Royal Army Service Corps
Rev. Alexander Dallas Lecky Ennis, Royal Army Chaplains' Department
Dora Longair Esslemont, Queen Mary's Army Auxiliary Corps
Capt. Arthur Henry Evans, Royal Army Medical Corps
Capt. Cecil Hugh Silvester Evans, Royal Engineers
Isabella Mercer Ewing, Controller, Queen Mary's Army Auxiliary Corps
Temp Lt.-Col. James Ezechiel, late Indian Army
Capt. Charles Horace John Fagan, Royal Artillery
Maj. David Alexander Fairbairn, West Riding Regiment
Temp Capt. James Ross Fairbairn, Durham Light Infantry
Lt.-Col. Henry George Falkner, Royal Army Medical Corps
Capt. Gilbert Valentine Fanell, 99th Infantry Indian Army
Temp Capt. Edward George Duncan Fawoett, Royal Army Ordnance Corps
Maj. Edmund Fearenside  Manchester Regiment
Maj. Charles Grincill Fellowes, Royal Artillery
Temp Maj. Donald Ferguson, Seaforth Highlanders
Maj. Spencer Charles Ferguson, Northumberland Fusiliers
Capt. Christopher Senior Field, Worcestershire Regiment, att. Nigeria Regiment, West African Frontier Force
Temp Maj. Vernon Shaw Taylor Fincken  
Lt.-Col. Richard John Findlay, Royal Army Ordnance Corps
Temp Maj. William Thomas Finlayson, Royal Army Medical Corps
Capt. Colin Fish, Staff for Royal Engineers Service
Maj. Vernon Frederick Fitch, Royal Field Artillery
Maj. Gordon William Fitzgerald, Royal Army Medical Corps
Maj. William Coulson Fitzgerald, late Royal Irish Fusiliers
Capt. and Bt. Maj. James Archibald St. George Fitzwarenne-Despencer-Robertson, Royal Welsh Fusiliers
Maj. Henry Slane Fleming
Lt.-Col. Henry Rivers Fletcher, Norfolk Regiment
Temp Maj. Edwin Howard Flew, Army Pay Corps
Lt. William Henry Flinn, Royal Irish Rifles
Quartermaster and Capt. Herbert George Henry Fogg  Royal Army Service Corps
Lt. Philip Edward Broadley Fooks, Royal Garrison Artillery
Temp Maj. Robert Foran, Army Pay Corps
Maj. George Newton Ford, London Regiment
Capt. John Theodore Ford, Hampshire Regiment
Temp Maj. Cornelius William Foreman, Royal Army Service Corps
Temp Capt. Hugh Carlton Formby
Lt.-Col. John Formby, Lancashire Volunteer Corps
Capt. and Bt. Maj. Charles Matthew Forster, Royal Engineers
Capt. Widenham Francis Widenham Fosbery  Royal Defence Corps
Capt. and Bt. Maj. Alexander Grant Russell Foulerton, Royal Army Medical Corps
Maj. and Bt. Lt.-Col. George Curran Orr Fowler, Royal Army Veterinary Corps
Maj. Robert Michael Douglas Fox, Yorkshire Light Infantry
Temp Maj. George Warren Frazer, Royal Army Service Corps
Temp Capt. Harry Branston Freer, Royal Army Service Corps
Capt. and Bt. Maj. Colin Charlwood Frye, Royal Army Medical Corps
Maj. Cecil Robert Fryer, Suffolk Regiment
Lt.-Col. Arthur Fuller-Acland-Hood, Cheshire Regiment
Capt. Charles John Dickenson Gair, Royal Army Medical Corps
Temp Capt. Sidney Galtrey
Maj. James Muir Galloway, Royal Field Artillery
Capt. FitzRoy Gardner
Lt.-Col. Frederick Charles Garrett, Northern Cyclist Battalion
Maj. Lawrence Challoner Garratt, Coldstream Guards
Maj. William Alexander Stuart Gemmell  Royal Artillery
Dorothy Gervers, Controller, Queen Mary's Army Auxiliary Corps
Lt.-Col. William Naunton Roger Gilbert-Cooper, East Surrey Regiment
Maj. Godfrey Douglas Giles, Royal Field Artillery
Capt. Arthur Herbert Giles, Gloucestershire Regiment, attd. Nigeria Regiment
Temp Capt. James Herbert Wainwright Gill, Royal Engineers
Maj. Vincent Andrew Gillam, York and Lancaster Regiment
Capt. James Adam Kirkwood Gillies, Royal Defence Corps
Lt.-Col. Henry Thomas Gilling  Royal Field Artillery
Temp Capt. Conrad Theodore Gimingham, Royal Engineers
Quartermaster and Lt.-Col. Andrew Fitzwilliam Gleeson, Royal Army Service Corps
Capt. James Alison Glover  Royal Army Medical Corps
Temp Capt. Montague Gluckstein, Royal Engineers
Lt.-Col. Alfred Davis Godley, Oxfordshire Volunteer Corps
Maj. Frank Goldsmith, Suffolk Yeomanry
Capt. Frederick Lucien Golla  Royal Army Medical Corps
Lt.-Col. Edward Wilberforce Goodall  Royal Army Medical Corps
Capt. and Bt. Maj. Robert Blunde Goodden, Welsh Regiment
Temp Capt. Aubrey Goodwin, Royal Army Medical Corps
Maj. Edward Ian Drumearn Gordon, Royal Scots Fusiliers
Capt. George Gordon, Argyll and Sutherland Highlanders
Lt. William Cyril Gover, Royal Garrison Artillery
Maj. William Francis Newby Grant, Northamptonshire Regiment
Maj. William Griffith Grant, late Lincolnshire Regiment
Maj. Alexander Charles Edward Gray  Royal Army Medical Corps
Rev. Earnest William Green, Royal Army Chaplains' Department
Temp Hon Capt. James Gregg, Royal Army Veterinary Corps
Maj. Lancelot Mare Gregson, Grenadier Guards
Temp Lt. Robert Holmes Arbuthnot Gresson  
Capt. Gronwy Robert Griffith, Royal Welsh Fusiliers
Lt.-Col. Charles Griffiths, Rem. Service, late Indian Army
Temp Capt. Noel Marshall Griffiths, Royal Army Service Corps
Rev. Trevor Griffiths, Royal Army Chaplains' Department
Lt. Thomas Reginald Grigson, Royal Engineers
Lt. William Edwin Grimshaw, Royal Artillery
Lt.-Col. John Ellis Griss, Royal Engineers
Temp Quartermaster and Maj. John James Grubb  Royal West Surrey Regiment
Capt. Martin Nepean Traill Gubbins  Royal Artillery
Hon Lt.-Col. Robert Lindsay Guthrie, late 1st Lanarcshire Volunteer Regiment
Capt. and Bt. Maj. Robert Lyall Guthrie  Royal Army Medical Corps
Quartermaster and Maj. George Gyngell, Dorsetshire Regiment
Quartermaster and Maj. Patrick Hackett, Hampshire Regiment
Capt. Arthur Hacking
Maj. Edward Dashwood Haggitt, Royal Engineers
Lt. Walter Churchill Hale  Royal Field Artillery
Rev. James Tooke Hales, Royal Army Chaplains' Department
Lt.-Col. Michael Francis Halford, York and Lancaster Regiment
Lt.-Col. Alexander Nelson Hall, Oxfordshire Yeomanry
Quartermaster and Maj. Douglas Hall
Maj. George Leslie Hall, Royal Engineers
Rev. Richard Hall, Royal Army Chaplains' Department
Temp Lt. Harry Mainwaring Hallsworth, Royal Engineers
Lt. Herbert Adolph Hambleton, Royal Field Artillery
Capt. Ronald James Hamilton
Maj. Richard James Hamlin, Royal Army Ordnance Corps
Capt. Harry Williams Hamlett, Royal Field Artillery
Maj. Everard Ernest Hanbury, Scots Guards
Maj. Eric Thomas Henry Hanbury Tracy, Coldstream Guards
Temp Maj. William Hubert Alers Hankey
Temp Maj. Charles Graham Hannay, Royal Army Service Corps
Rev. Robert Edward Vemon Hanson, Royal Army Chaplains' Department
Capt. Cecil Redfern Harding, Irish Guards
Temp Maj. Confred Napier Mitchell Hardy, Army Pay Department
Quartermaster and Maj. George Henry Harlow, Royal Army Service Corps
Lt.-Col. Charles Sydney Harris, Army Pay Department
Temp Maj. Emanuel Vincent Harris, Royal Engineers
Maj. George Arthur Harris 
Quartermaster and Maj. Walter Reginald Harris, Royal West Surrey Regiment
Lt. John Stubbs Harrison, Royal Field Artillery
Capt. Ernest James Hart, Northumberland Fusiliers
Capt. Kenneth Eugene Hart  Royal West Surrey Regiment
Temp Lt.-Col. Ernest William Hart-Cox, Army Pay Department
Capt. Ronald Victor Okes Hart-Synot  Royal Guernsey Militia
Capt. Frank Barrington Harvey, Worcestershire Regiment
Maj. Henry Wilfred Haughton  Buckinghamshire Yeomanry
Temp Maj. John Alfred Hawkes, Royal Engineers
Temp Maj. Henry Hawkins
Lt.-Col. Frederick Haworth  Cumberland and Westmorland Volunteer Corps
Lt.-Col. Frederick Arthur Hayden  West Riding Regiment
Surgeon-Capt. George Sullivan Clifford Hayes, 1st Life Guards
Lt. Arthur William Ainley Headley, Royal Engineers
Maj. Samuel Ferguson Heard, Army Pay Department
Lt.-Col. Michael Leo Hearn, Royal Army Medical Corps
Temp Capt. Thomas George Heatley, Royal Army Veterinary Corps
Capt. Rowland Philip Arthur Helps  Lancashire Fusiliers
Lt.-Col. Coote Robert Hely-Hutchison, Royal Fusiliers
Maj. John Acheson Henderson  8th Hussars
Lt.-Col. Hon George Edward Heneage, Lincolnshire Regiment
Lt.-Col. Sir Reginald Hennell  Middlesex Regiment
Temp Lt.-Col. Alfred Stanley Henry, Scottish Rifles
Lt.-Col. Ernest Roland Herbert, Huntingdonshire Cyclist Battalion
Capt. Arthur Cecily Herne, South Lancashire Regiment
Maj. George James Herridge, Royal Army Service Corps
Capt. Gerald Charles Irwin Hervey, Leicestershire Regiment
Maj. Edward Vincent Osborne Hewett  Royal West Kent Regiment
Temp Maj. John Theodore Hewitt
Temp Lt. Noel Heywood, Royal Army Service Corps
Capt. John Esmond Longuet Higgins  London Regiment
Hon Lt.-Col. Joseph Walker Higgs-Walker
Maj. Frederick George Antrim Hill, Royal Garrison Artillery
Maj. and Bt. Lt.-Col. Frank William Rowland Hill  Royal Army Ordnance Corps
Temp Maj. Trevor Montague Hill, 2nd Dragoon Guards
Capt. John William Hillyard, Royal Berkshire Regiment
Temp Capt. R. S. Hilton
Temp Hon Maj. Thomas Guy Macaulay Hine, Royal Army Medical Corps
Temp Capt. Alfred Joseph Hingston, Royal Engineers
Maj. Herbert Hoare, 5th Dragoon Guards
Capt. Hodgkinson, Robert Frank Byron, Nottinghamshire and Derbyshire Regiment
Lt.-Col. Thomas White Holdich  East Yorkshire Regiment
Temp Maj. John Joseph Holdsworth, Army Pay Department
Lt. Charles-Frederick Holford  Royal Horse Artillery
Temp Maj. Wilfred Holland
Temp Maj. William Edward Home, Royal Army Medical Corps
Maj. Grosvenor Arthur Alex Hood, Viscount Hood, Grenadier Guards
Temp Maj. and Lt.-Col. Vernon Vavasour Hooley, Royal Army Service Corps
Temp Capt. Herbert Ross Hooper, Royal Engineers
Temp Maj. and Lt.-Col. Sir John Augustus Hope  labour Corps
Maj. Percy Alfred Hopkins, Worcestershire Regiment
Capt. and Bt. Maj. Robert Victor Galbraith Horn  Royal Scots Fusiliers
Temp Capt. Wilfred Allen Howells, Royal Welsh Fusiliers
Lt. Edward Jonas Hoyle, Royal Engineers
Lt.-Col. Emanuel Hoyle, Royal Army Service Corps
Capt. Reginald Guy Hue-Williams, East Surrey Regiment
Maj. Claud Allard Erskine Hughes, Cheshire Regiment
Capt. Ernest Cranmer Hughes  Royal Army Medical Corps
Capt. Gordon Stewart Hughman, Middlesex Regiment
Temp Capt. Bernard Humphrey
Hon Capt. Percy Harry Illingworth Humphreys
Lt.-Col. William Humphreys  Lancashire Fusiliers
Maj. Thomas Edward Carew Hunt  Royal Berkshire Regiment
Lt. Evan Austin Hunter, Royal Army Service Corps
Temp Maj. Herbert Patrick Hunter, Royal Garrison Artillery
Lt.-Col. Maurice Hunter  Nottinghamshire and Derbyshire Regiment
Temp Maj. Arthur Frederick Hurst, Royal Army Medical Corps
Temp Capt. and Bt. Maj. Charles Edward Inglis, Royal Engineers
Temp Maj. Jeremiah Inns, Royal ArtilleryS
Maj. Leonard Paul Irby, King's Royal Rifle Corps
Lt. Ernest Lascelles Iremonger, Scottish Horse
Jessie Millicent Jackson  Matron, Queen Alexandra's Imperial Military Nursing Service Reserve
Lt. Samuel Jackson, Royal Army Service Corps
Capt. George Lionel Jameson, Royal Engineers
Quartermaster and Capt. Ernest Janes, Royal Army Medical Corps
Maj. William Jardine  Royal Scots
Capt. William Bertie Jarvis, Leicestershire Regiment
Lt.-Col. Patrick Douglas Jeffreys  Kent Volunteer Corps
Maj. and Bt. Lt.-Col. Reginald Frank Jelley, Royal Engineers
Maj. Harold Jellicorse, Royal Sussex Regiment
Lt. Reginald Jeffery, Royal Field Artillery
Capt. George John Jenkins  Royal Army Medical Corps
Temp Lt.-Col. John Alexander Jenkins, East Yorkshire Regiment
Temp Capt. Herbert Cecil Joel  Royal Army Ordnance Corps
Lt. Frederick Nelson Johns, Royal Engineers
Lt. Albert Johnson  Royal Field Artillery
Maj. Henry Campbell Johnson, King's Own Yorkshire Light Infantry
Maj. Bruce Campbell Johnston, Royal Engineers
Capt. Edgar William Jones, Royal Engineers
Temp Capt. Russell Jones, Welsh Regiment
Lt.-Col. Stephen James Melville Jopp
Maj. William Alfred Jupp, East Lancashire Regiment 
Quartermaster and Capt. Herbert Alfred Joy  Royal Artillery
Maj. and Bt. Lt.-Col. Henry Albert Kaulbach, Royal Lancaster Regiment
Temp Maj. Herbert Davenport Kay
Capt. Cyril Arthur Keays, Royal Army Service Corps
Quartermaster and Capt. John James Keene  Royal Army Service Corps
Temp Lt. Gerald Keith, Royal Army Ordnance Corps
Quartermaster and Maj. James Albert Kellett, Royal Engineers
Lt. Richard Cecil Kelly, London Regiment
Maj. William Redmond Prendergast Kemmis-Betty, Royal Berkshire Regiment
Maj. Edmund Roger Allday Kerrison  late Royal Artillery
Capt. Robert Ellis Key, York and Lancaster Regiment
Lt.-Col. Robert Robertson Kimmitt, London Regiment
Capt. William Henry King, Connaught Rangers
Temp Maj. John Rudolph Kingston, Royal Engineers
Rev. Michael Ward Kinloch, Royal Army Chaplains' Department
Maj. Edmund Bertram Kirby, Royal Field Artillery
Lt.-Col. Albert Edward Kirk  West Yorkshire Regiment
Lt. James Kirkland, Royal Army Ordnance Corps
Lt. Alexander Kennedy Kirsop, Northumberland Fusiliers
Maj. Alexander Wentworth Kitson, Royal Army Service Corps
Temp Maj. Paul Hengrave Kitson, Royal Army Service Corps
Capt. Charles Louis William Morley Knight  Royal Artillery
Maj. James Stuart Knox, East Yorkshire Regiment
Temp Lt. John Brown Laidlaw, Royal Engineers
Temp Maj. Bertram Lambert, Royal Engineers
Maj. George Herbert Lambert  London Regiment
Temp Maj. Thomas Erskine Lambert, Royal Army Service Corps
Maj. and Bt. Lt.-Col. George Charles Lambton  Worcestershire Regiment
Maj. Henry Thornton Laming  5th Res. Cav. Regiment
Lt.-Col. Philip Langclale, East Riding Yeomanry
Lt.-Col. Percy Edward Langworthy-Parry  London Regiment
Maj. George Reginald Lascelles, Royal Fusiliers
Temp Maj. Walter William Laskey, Royal Army Service Corps
Temp Maj. John Ion Latham, Royal Engineers
Maj. Ernest Browning Lathbury, Royal Army Medical Corps
Maj. Herbert Curling Laverton, Royal Highlanders
Temp Capt. Robert William Rowland Law  
Maj. Hervey Major Lawrence  Scottish Rifles
Lt.-Col. Henry Gordon Leahy, Royal Garrison Artillery
Maj. Alfred Leamy, Royal Army Ordnance Corps
Lt.-Col. Harold Ledward
Maj. John Robert Lee 
Lt.-Col. Roderick Livingstone Lees  Lancashire Fusiliers
Lt. Victor Lefobure, Essex Regiment
Maj. Edward James Leggett, Royal Army Ordnance Corps
Maj. Robert Anthony Linington Leggett  Worcestershire Regiment
Capt. Geoffrey Hamilton Leigh, South Lancashire Regiment
Temp Maj. H. S. Le Rossignol, Royal Jersey Militia
Col. Robert Thomas Morland Lethbridge, Army Pay Department
Lt.-Col. Charles Cameron Leveson-Gower  Royal Artillery
Temp Capt. George Ernest Lewis, Royal Army Service Corps
Maj. Cuthbert Hillyer Ley, Royal Engineers
Quartermaster and Maj. Harry Sylvanus Lickmau, Ext. Reg. Empl
Hon Maj. Willie Cresswell Link, Royal Army Ordnance Corps
Capt. Victor Alexander John Hope, Marquess of Linlithgow, Lothians and Border Horse
Maj. Sir John Lister-Kaye  Royal Army Service Corps
Bt. Lt.-Col. John Little, Northumberland Regiment
Maj. Marchall William Litton, Royal Irish Fusiliers
Maj. George William David Bowen Lloyd, Royal Welsh Fusiliers
Capt. Thomas Lodge, Royal West Surrey Regiment
Maj. Francis Carleton Logan Logan, Lancashire Fusiliers
Maj. William Logan, Royal Army Veterinary Corps
Maj. Sydney Francis McIlree Lomer, King's Royal Rifle Corps
Capt. Gerard Hanslip Long, Suffolk Regiment
Capt. Henry John Leicester Longden  Army School Department
Maj. Charles Frederick Gemley Low, Royal Army Ordnance Corps
Quartermaster and Capt. James Lindsay Low, Royal Engineers
Temp Maj. Andrew-Alfred Lowe, Royal Engineers
Lt.-Col. Thomas Enoch Lowe, South Staffordshire Regiment
Temp Maj. Reginald Hugh Lucas, Royal Army Service Corps
Col. Thomas Lucas Woodwright Lucas  Glamorgan Volunteer Corps
Capt. Dudley Owen Lumley  Wiltshire Regiment
Edith Mary Lyde  Matron, Queen Alexandra's Imperial Military Nursing Service
Maj. Arthur Abram Lyle, London Regiment
Temp Capt. Oliver Lyle, Highland Light Infantry
Maj. Charles Joseph Edward Addis McArthur, Kings Own Scottish Borderers
Capt. Henry Montray Jones McCance
Capt. Frederic Ewing McClellan, Middlesex Regiment
Temp Maj. Michael McCormack  Royal West Surrey Regiment
Maj. John McDermott, Indian Army
Temp Hon Lt.-Col. Peter Macdiurmid  Royal Army Medical Corps
Maj. Andrew Edward Macdonald, Cameron Highlanders
Capt. Angus G. Macdonald  Royal Army Medical Corps
2nd Lt. James McDonald, King's Own Scottish Borderers
Maj. John McI. McDougall, Royal Garrison Artillery
Maj. Donald Keith McDowell  Royal Army Medical Corps
Temp Maj. Samuel Johnson McDowell, Army Pay Department
Temp Maj. James McEwen, Staff for Royal Engineers Service
Maj. Albert William Crawford McFall, Yorkshire Light Infantry
Temp Capt. Charles Hamilton McGuinness
Capt. James Douglas MacIndoe  Scots Guards
Capt. Alexander Donald MacKeanzie, Royal Engineers
Maj. Colin Mansfield Mackenzie  London Regiment
Capt. Eric Francis Wallace Mackenzie  Royal Army Medical Corps
Lt.-Col. Robert Wilson McKergow, Sussex Yeomanry
Lt.-Col. Reginald L'Estrange McKerrell, Argyll and Sutherland Highlanders
Lt. Archibald Donald MacKinnon  
Rev. James MacLeod, Royal Army Chaplains' Department
Maj. Kellerman Eyre McMahon, Shropshire Light Infantry
Maj. and Bt. Lt.-Col. Andrew McMunn, Royal Army Medical Corps
Rev. Ronald MacPherson, Royal Army Chaplains' Department
Capt. and Bt. Maj. Gordon Nevil Macready  Royal Engineers
Maj. Henry Patrick Magill, North Lancashire Regiment
H.H. Prince Maj. Charles Mahé de Chenal de la Bourdonnais, Royal Field Artillery
Lt.-Col. Frederick Colin Maitland, Viscount Maitland, Northumberland Fusiliers
Capt. Arthur Griffiths Maitland-Jones  Royal Army Medical Corps
Temp Maj. Matthew James Manuia Makalua
Maj. Edward John Malim, Machine Gun Corps
Maj. John Charles Medland Manley, Royal Artillery
Maj. William Edward Manley, Royal Artillery
Maj. Reginald Ingram Marians, London Regiment
Temp Maj. Edward Seaborn Marks
Temp Capt. Morris Edgar Marples, Royal Army Service Corps
Maj. Charles Howard Marsden, Yorkshire Regiment
Temp Capt. Herbert Westmorland Marshall, Royal Engineers
Maj. Mark Henry Marshall, Royal Army Service Corps
Capt. Charles Jasper Martin  Royal Army Service Corps
Temp Lt.-Col. Horace Martin, Royal Engineers
Capt. William Edward Maskell, Devonshire Regiment
Temp Maj. James Ernest Mason, Royal Army Service Corps
Capt. Frederick Hill Master, Royal Engineers
Capt. William Harold Mather, Royal Engineers
Temp Maj. Edward Matthews, Cheshire Regiment
Temp Capt. Ernest James Matthews, Rem. Service
Capt. Llewellin Washington Matthews
Lt. RichardJohnCaswell Maunsell
Temp Maj. Arthur Henry May, Royal Engineers
Temp Capt. Arthur John May, Royal Engineers
Temp Maj. Mark James Mayhew, Royal Army Service Corps
Temp Maj. Edgar William Mayor, West Riding Regiment
Temp Maj. Charles Mead, Royal Army Service Corps
Capt. Harry Edward Meade, Royal Fusiliers
Lt.-Col. William Mellis  Gordon Highlanders
Capt. Charles Edward Mepham, Royal Army Ordnance Corps
Capt. Leonard Charles Rudolph Messel, East Kent Regiment
Maj. Charles Bayard Messiter  Gloucestershire Regiment
Lt. Lionel Harry Methuen  Argyll and Sutherland Highlanders
Hon Capt. Charles Henry Milburn, Royal Army Medical Corps
Lt.-Col. Thomas Alan Milburn, Border Regiment
Lt.-Col. Harry Cyril Millican, Royal Army Service Corps
Temp Maj. Francis Henry Millman
Lt. William Henry Ennor Millman
Capt. George Wardlaw Milne, Royal Army Medical Corps
Temp Lt.-Col. Arthur Brownlow Mitchell, Royal Army Medical Corps
Lt.-Col. Spencer Mitchell, Manchester Regiment
Maj. Francis Arthur Molony, Royal Engineers
Maj. John Duncan Monro, Royal Engineers
Lt.-Col. Lord George William Montagu-Douglas-Scott, late Lothians and Border Horse
Maj. Stewart Francis Montague, Royal Artillery
Maj. Victor Robert Montgomerie, 2nd Life Guards
Temp Capt. James Stuart Hamilton Moore
Maj. William Moore, London Regiment
Temp Maj. Kenyon Pascoe Vaughan Morgan, Royal Army Service Corps
Temp Maj. Godfrey Ewaft Morgans, Royal Engineers
Capt. Ernest FitzRoy Morrison-Bell, Royal Wiltshire Yeomanry
Temp Maj. John Smythe Morrow  Royal Army Medical Corps
Temp Lt. James Thomas Morton-Clarke  Royal Army Service Corps
Capt. Gavin Black Loudon Motherwell, Royal Scots Fusiliers
Capt. John Coney Moulton, Wiltshire Regiment
Lt.-Col. Herbert William Moxon, Staff for Royal Engineers Service
Capt. John Muir, Royal Army Medical Corps
Lt.-Col. Robert Bunten Muir, Leicestershire Yeomanry
Capt. the Hon Charles Henry George Mulholland  11th Hussars
Maj. James Murphy, late Royal Field Artillery
Lt.-Col. Alan Sim Murray, North Staffordshire Regiment
Temp Capt. Everitt George Dunne Murray, Royal Army Medical Corps
Temp Capt. William Alfred Murray  Royal Army Medical Corps
Temp Capt. William Newcome Musgrave, Royal Army Service Corps
Temp Capt. Edward Jonah Nathan
Maj. Arthur Nelson, Staff
Lt.-Col. William Nelson, late Scottish Rifles
Temp Capt. George Nesbit  Northumberland Fusiliers
Lt. Cyril John Nesbitt-Dufort, Royal Army Service Corps
Temp Maj. William Henry Newham, Royal Army Service Corps
Maj. StephenGuy Newton, 12th Battalion Yorkshire Light Infantry
Maj. Thomas Cochrane Newton  Royal Field Artillery
Maj. Cosmos Charles Richard Nevill 
Capt. John Nicol  London Regiment
Maj. Edward Alfred Nicholls, Staff for Royal Engineers Secv
Maj. Thomas Brinsley Nicholson, West India Regiment
Temp Maj. Stephen William Nicholson  Royal Artillery
Temp Capt. Henry James Nind, Royal Artillery
Capt. Charles George Ashburton Nix, Res
Capt. Richard Noble, 7th Dragoon Guards
Maj. Henry Marshall Nornabell  Royal Field Artillery
Lt.-Col. George Roubiliac Hodges Nugent, Royal Artillery
Capt. John O'Brien, Hampshire Regiment
Maj. Manus Basil Hugh O'Donel, Royal Engineers
Capt. Léonce L'Hermite Ogier, Royal Jersey Militia
Capt. Alan Grant Ogilvie  Royal Field Artillery
Maj. and Bt. Lt.-Col. Alexander Ogilvie  Royal Engineers
Maj. Arthur Bertram Ogle, Royal Engineers
Lt.-Col. Christopher George Oldfield  Royal Army Ordnance Corps
Maj. Arthur Edwin Oppenheim, Indian Army
Temp Lt. William Oswald Orford, Royal Field Artillery
Capt. Guy Allen Colpoys Ormsby-Johnson  Army Pay Department
Capt. and Bt. Maj. Frank George Orr, Royal Field Artillery
Maj. Patrick O'Sullivan, Royal Artillery
Lt.-Col. Robert James William Oswald, Royal Army Medical Corps
Temp Capt. and Bt. Maj. Franas Davidson Outram, Royal Engineers
Lt.-Col. Herbert Hawkesworth Owtram, Lancashire Volunteer Corps
Maj. Edmund Christopher Packe  Royal Fusiliers
Maj. Frederick Edward Packe, Welsh Regiment
Temp Maj. Frederick Henry Padfield
Temp Maj. Archibald James Palmer, Tank Corps
Temp Capt. Ernest-Henry Palmer, Royal Army Ordnance Corps
Temp Maj. Edward Percy Hamilton Pardoe, King's African Rifles
Maj. Francis Hearle Parkin, South Staffordshire Regiment
Lt.-Col. Percival George Parkinson, Royal Army Ordnance Corps
Capt. Harry Gordon Parkyn, Rifle Brigade
Maj. Charles Lister Parmiter, King's Liverpool Regiment
Capt. Cecil William Chase Parr, Malay States Volunteer Rifles
Capt. Dealtrey Charles Part, 21st Lancers
Maj. Edward Cecil Morgan Parry, East Kent Regiment
Lt.-Col. Christopher Thackray Parsons  Royal Army Medical Corps
Capt. Edward Laker Paske, Duke of Cornwall's Light Infantry
Capt. James Patch, Devonshire Regiment
Maj. Daniel Wells Patterson  Royal Army Medical Corps
Temp Maj. George Hedworth Pattinson  Royal Engineers
Capt. William Paxman, London Regiment
Lt.-Col. Walter King Peake, Gloucestershire Regiment
Temp Quartermaster and Maj. John Wesley Pearce, Royal Engineers
Temp Maj. William Pearce, Royal Engineers
Capt. Charles Edmund Pearson
Temp Maj. Jiohn Barrington Pearson, Royal Engineers
Maj. Robert Stanley Pearson, Yorkshire Hussars
Capt. Ernest Hubert Pease, Yorkshire Regiment
Capt. Arthur Charlesworth Peebles, Royal Engineers
Maj. James Penketh, South Staffordshire Regiment
Temp Capt. and Bt. Maj. Francis Westby Perceval, Royal Army Ordnance Corps
Maj. Albert Augustus Perkins  Welsh Regiment
Capt. Aubrey Edmond Pery-Knox-Gore, Yorkshire Light Infantry
Lt.-Col. Henry Cecil Petre  Rifle Brigade
Temp Capt. Cyril Charles Phillips, Royal Garrison Artillery
Capt. and Bt. Maj. Charles Edmund Stanley Phillips, Royal West Kent Regiment
Lt. Ernest William Phillips, Royal Garrison Artillery
Quartermaster and Capt. William John Phillips, Royal Artillery
Temp Capt. Alrfred Cleveland Pickett, Royal Army Medical Corps
Capt. Wellesley George Pigott, Rifle Brigade
Maj. William Rattray Pirie, Royal Army Medical Corps
Maj. George Newton Pitt  Royal Army Medical Corps
Capt. Stewart Aitken Pixley, T.F. Res
Capt. James Charles Pocock, Royal Engineers
Temp Capt. Sydney Elsdon Pocock, Royal Army Service Corps
Lt.-Col. Arthur Erskine St. Vincent Pollard, Border Regiment
Capt. Allan Bingham Pollok, 7th Hrs
Maj. and Bt. Lt.-Col. Thomas Anselan Pollok-Morris, Highland Light Infantry
Maj. Henry Reynold Poole  Royal Garrison Artillery
Temp Hon Maj. Edmund Daniel Porges
Maj. and Bt. Lt.-Col. James Archer Potter, Leicestershire Regiment
Maj. Thomas James Potter, Royal Army Medical Corps
Capt. and Bt. Maj. Charles Potts
Capt. Faville Clement Poulton, Royal Army Ordnance Corps
Maj. George Robert Powell, North Somerset Yeomanry
Lt.-Col. Assheton Pownall  London Regiment
Lt. James Dayidson Pratt, Gordon Highlanders
Maj. Charles Henry Beeston Prescott-Westcar, East Kent Yeomanry
Lt.-Col. William Tertius Pretty  Suffolk Regiment
Capt. and Bt. Maj. William Henry Russell Prewer, Royal Artillery
Maj. and Bt. Lt.-Col. Geoffrey Robert Pridham  Royal Engineers
Beatrice Ada Priestley, Unit Administrator, Queen Mary's Army Auxiliary Corps
Maj. William Priestly, Durham Light Infantry
Capt. Alexander Ferguson Primrose, Royal Engineers
Temp Lt.-Col. Seton Sidney Pringle, Royal Army Medical Corps
Maj. Harold Astley Somerset Prior  Yorkshire Regiment
Lt.-Col. William Godfrey Probert, Royal Army Service Corps
Temp Lt.-Col. William Thomas Prout  Royal Army Medical Corps
Maj. Arthur William Purser  Royal Field Artillery
Temp Maj. Francis Carmichael Purser, Royal Army Medical Corps
Temp Maj. Thomas Fortune Purves, Royal Engineers
Lt.-Col. George Elliot Aubone Pyle, London Regiment
Capt. Frederick Dennis Pyne, Royal Engineers
Lt. Raymond Fitzwilliam Quirke, Royal Garrison Artillery
Hon Lt.-Col. WilliamEnsley Raley, late York and Lancaster Regiment
Maj. Thomas Rankin
Quartermaster and Hon Capt. Robert Sheffield Ransome, late Royal Welsh Fusiliers (dated 18 March 1919.)
Rev. Albert Edward Rawr, Royal Army Chaplains' Department
Capt. and Bt. Maj. Geoffrey Grahame Rawson  Royal Engineers
Capt. Archibald Hugh Read, North Staffordshire Regiment
Lt.-Col. George Reavell  Northumberland Fusiliers
Capt. Patrick John Reeves, Royal Berkshire Regiment
Capt. Sidney George Redman, Northumberland Fusiliers
Maj. Richard Meadows Rendel, Royal Artillery
Capt. Thomas Shuttleworth Kendall, Dorsetshire Regiment
Maj. Louis George Stanley Reynolds, London Regiment
Maj. Sidney Latimer Reynolds, Royal Army Service Corps
Capt. William Charles Noel Reynolds, Irish Guards
Maj. Hubert Victor Rhodes, Nottinghamshire and Derbyshire Regiment
Temp Capt. Stanislas Matthew Hastings Rhodes
Maj. Malcolm Brown Bookey Riall, West Yorkshire Regiment
Maj. Henry Meredyth Richards, Royal Welsh Fusiliers
Maj. John Charles Field Richards, Hampshire Regiment
Capt. Thomas Richardson
Maj. Edwin Hautonville Richardson
Maj. and Hon Lt.-Col. Charles du Plat Richardson-Griffiths  Gloucestershire Regiment
Maj. Brownlow Riddell  Royal Army Medical Corps
Lt. Robert Edward Ridgway, Royal Garrison Artillery
Capt. and Bt. Maj. Blyth Ritchie, 13th Hussars
Temp Capt. Edward Guy Ripley, Royal Army Service Corps
Maj. Arthur Neil Stewart Roberts, Royal West Surrey Regiment
Temp Maj. Frank Wereat Roberts  Royal Engineers (ret.)
Maj. George Fossett Roberts, Royal Field Artillery
Lt.-Col. Hugh Bradley Roberts, Royal Artillery
Maj. and Bt. Lt.-Col. David Stephen Robertson, Royal Scots Fusiliers
Maj. and Bt. Lt.-Col. Frederick William Robertson, Royal Engineers
Temp Lt.-Col. John Kerr Robertson, Royal Engineers
Temp Maj. Malcolm Robertson  
Maj. Lancelot Irby Oxford Robins, Welsh Regiment
Lt.-Col. Benjamin Robert Roche, Bedfordshire Regiment
Temp Lt. Lincoln Coslett Rogers, Royal Army Ordnance Corps
Temp Maj. Thomas Leslie Rogers, Army Pay Department
Quartermaster and Lt.-Col. Ambrose George Rose, Royal Army Service Corps
Maj. Conrad Ross, Royal Artillery
Hon Capt. William Ross, late Oxfordshire and Buckinghamshire Light Infantry
Temp Maj. Philip Simpson Rostron, late Royal Horse Artillery
Maj. Robert Houston Rowan, Royal Engineers
Temp Capt. Farnel Rowbotham, Royal Army Ordnance Corps
Capt. diaries Rowell, Northumberland Fusiliers
Capt. Robert Pugh Rowlands  Royal Army Medical Corps
Lt.-Col. Edmund Royds  Lincolnshire Volunteer Corps
Capt. Ernest Rupert Royle
Lt. Henry Rummius, Gloucestershire Regiment
Maj. and Bt. Lt.-Col. Charles Rundle, Royal Army Medical Corps
Lt.-Col. and Bt. Col. Frank Montagu Randall  City of London Volunteer Corps
Temp Capt. Edmond Cecil Russell
Capt. Thomas Russell, Royal Army Medical Corps
Hon Capt. Hugh Septimus Kroenig Ryan, Royal Engineers
Quartermaster and Maj. Daniel Sallis, Worcestershire Regiment
Maj. Samuel George Sanders, 4th Dragoon Guards
Temp Maj. Robert William Philip Sands, Army Pay Department
Lt.-Col. John Edward Sarsoaa, Leicestershire Volunteer Corps
Maj. Clement Richard Satterthwaite, Royal Engineers
Lt.-Col. William Arthur Gore Saunders-Knox-Gore, Royal Artillery
Capt. and Bt. Maj. Charles Carleton Saunders-O'Mahoney, Royal Army Service Corps
Maj. Clare Ruxton Uvedale Suvile  Royal Fusiliers
Maj. George William Sayer, Royal Engineers
Maj. Raymond Cecil Sayers, Royal Artillery
Hon Capt. Henry Alexander Schank, Lancashire Fusiliers
Maj. William Ernest Schofield, Royal Army Veterinary Corps
Capt. Ivor Buchanan Wyndham Scott, Royal Artillery
Quartermaster and Maj. James Scott  Manchester Regiment
Capt. Edward William Howet Blackburn Scratton, Royal 1st Devonshire Yeomanry
Lt. James Gerald Lamb Searight, Royal Scots
Capt. Keith John Seth-Smith, Royal Field Artillery
Capt. Edward Seymour  Grenadier Guards
Maj. Evelyn Francis Edward Seymour  (Royal Dublin Fusiliers)
Lt. Lionel Seymour, Hertfordshire Regiment
Maj. Roger Cecil Seys  Royal Artillery
Lt. Col. Leonard Julius Shadwell, Lancashire Fusiliers
Capt. Rowland Sharp, Royal Engineers
Lt. James Henry Montague Shaw
Capt. Thomas Sheedy, Royal Army Medical Corps
Lt. Eric William Sheppard, Royal West Kent Regiment
Capt. George William Shore, Royal Army Medical Corps
Maj. Henry George Shorto, Royal Army Service Corps
Maj. W. Malacca Sime, Volunteer Rifles
Lt.-Col. John Henry Lang Sims  North Lancashire Regiment
Maj. Robert Dunbar Sinclair Weanyss, Gordon Highlanders
Maj. Eric Ommanney Skaife, Royal Welsh Fusiliers
Maj. Arthur Briton Smallman  Royal Army Medical Corps
Lt. Thomas Fraser Mackenzie Smart, Northumberland Fusiliers
Lt.-Col. William Wintringham Smethurst, Royal Field Artillery
Capt. Arthur William Smith, Cambridgeshire Regiment
Temp Maj. Charles Edward Smith, Army Pay Department
Lt.-Col. George Frederick Smith  Royal Army Service Corps
Maj. Clarence Gorton Ross Smith, Army Pay Department
Temp Maj. Frederick Hargreaves Smith, Royal Army Service Corps
Maj. George Rainier de Herriez Smith, Indian Army Reserve of Officers, attd. Rem. Service
Maj. George Wilson Smith, King's Own Scottish Borderers
Lt.-Col. Julian Carter Carrington Smith  Indian Medical Service
Capt. S. Smith, Malay States Volunteer Rifles
Temp Capt. William Stanley Smith
Maj. Henry Cecil East Smithett, York and Lancaster Regiment
Maj. Standish George Smithwick, Royal Dublin Fusiliers
Maj. Frederick Philip Smyly
Temp Lt. Leonard Fowler Snelling, Royal Army Ordnance Corps
Capt. and Bt. Maj. Richard Talbot Snowden-Smith, Royal Army Service Corps
Capt. Arthur Granville Shames, Coldstream Guards
Maj. Charles Henry Fitzroy, Lord Southampton, Yorkshire Regiment
Capt. Edward Chayton Sowerby, Suffolk Regiment
Lt. Arthur Owen Spafford, Royal Engineers
Maj. Walter Augustus Sparrow, Royal Engineers
Maj. and Bt. Lt.-Col. Harrison Spencer, Royal Artillery
Capt. and Bt. Maj. Herbert Eames Spencer, Royal Wiltshire Yeomanry
Maj. Walter George Spencer  Royal Army Medical Corps
Temp Lt. Archibald Borthwick Spens, Royal Army Service Corps
Capt. John Ivan Spensi, Scottish Rifles
Capt. Thomas L. Squires, Royal Artillery
Maj. Arthur Clement Staniberg  Royal Army Medical Corps
Temp Capt. Henry Edmund Standage, Royal Army Service Corps
Temp Maj. William Percy Standish
Temp Capt. Robert Vinin Stanley Stanley, Royal Army Service Corps
Capt. William Henry Stanley-Jones, Seaforth Highlanders 
Lt.-Col. Gerald Walter James Fitzgerald Stannus, 1st City of London Yeomanry
Capt. and Bt. Maj. Guy Stewart St. Aubyn, King's Royal Rifle Corps
Temp Maj. Frederick Owen Stanford, Royal Engineers
Maj. Miles John Stapylton, Royal Army Service Corps
Temp Capt. John Stavers  Royal Army Service Corps
Hon Capt. Henry Squire Steele
Maj. Henry Alexander Steaming  10th Battalion, London Regiment
Maj. George Andrew Stephen, Gordon Highlanders
Temp Maj. Francis Trent Stephens, King's African Rifles
Maj. Leslie Nalder Stephens, Royal Artillery
Temp Lt. John Stephenson
Maj. Frederick John Stevens, West Yorkshire Regiment
Maj. Robert Stevenson  Royal Army Ordnance Corps
Maj. Reginald Holden Steward, Wiltshire Regiment
Lt.-Col. Albert Fortescue Stewart  Suffolk Regiment
Maj. Charles Stewart, Worcestershire Regiment
Capt. James Allan Stewart, Royal Scots Fusiliers, attd. Nigeria Regiment
Lt.-Col. Alexander Brodie Seton Stewart, Royal Army Medical Corps
Maj. James Stewart, Royal Engineers
Temp Capt. Harold Ramsay Stobie
Capt. Hubert Francis Stokes, Royal Irish Fusiliers
Maj. William Noel Stokes  Royal Army Ordnance Corps
Temp Maj. James Richard Neville Stopford, Viscount Stopford
Capt. Herbert Stott, Cheshire Regiment
Temp Capt. William Harle Stott, Royal Army Medical Corps
Capt. William Stoyle, Royal Field Artillery, attd. Royal Army Ordnance Corps
Acting Maj. Cecil John Charles Street  Royal Garrison Artillery
Temp Capt. Robert Henry Struben
Maj. George Kingston Sullivan  Yorkshire Light Infantry
Maj. Russell Henry Jocelyn Swan  Royal Army Medical Corps
Lt. Ernest Edward Swann, Essex Regiment
Capt. Henry Carol Sweeting, King's Royal Rifle Corps
Maj. Robert William Tate, Unattd. List
Maj. Cecil George Taylor
Maj. Charles Lancelot Deslandes Taylor, Royal Army Medical Corps
Capt. Jameis Taylor, Royal Army Medical Corps
Temp Capt. Robert Clark Taylor
Temp Maj. Max Teichman, Royal Army Service Corps
Maj. Robert Temperley  Northumberland Fusiliers
Temp Capt. Henry Moncrieff Tennent, Royal Army Service Corps
Temp Lt. Francis Theakston, Royal Engineers
Temp Maj. Lewis Thomas
Maj. A. M. Thompson, Singapore Vols.
Lt.-Col. George Thompson  Bedfordshire Regiment
Temp Capt. Henry Charles Stephens Thomson, Royal Army Service Corps
Capt. David Thomson  Royal Army Medical Corps
Maj. William Thorburn  King's Own Scottish Borderers
Capt. William Crockett Thome, Royal Engineers
Maj. Gerald Thorp, Royal Engineers
Temp Maj. Richard Eustace Tickell
Lt.-Col. James Tidbury  Royal Army Medical Corps
Maj. Henry William Marrett Tims  Royal Army Medical Corps
Quartermaster and Capt. Alexander Gray Tod, Royal Army Medical Corps
Lt. William Norman Tod, London Regiment
Lt.-Col. Morton James Baring Tomlin, London Regiment
Maj. Robert Ernest Tomlin-Money-Shewan, Royal Engineers
Capt. and Bt. Maj. Charles Bailey Toms
Maj. Arthur Seymour Toogood
Lt.-Col. Frederick Sherman Toogood  Royal Army Medical Corps
Lt. Henry William Towner, Royal Garrison Artillery
Maj. William Maxwell Tracy, Royal Army Ordnance Corps
Temp Lt.-Col. Paul Cuningham Edward Tribe, Royal Army Medical Corps
Lt. John Charles Trout, Royal Scots Fusiliers
Lt. John Monro Troutbeck, London Regiment
Quartermaster and Lt.-Col. Albert Napoleon Tucker, Royal Engineers
Capt. Richard Jennings Tucker, Bermuda Rifles Corps, attd. Lincolnshire Regiment
Temp Capt. and Bt. Maj. William John Tulloch, Royal Army Medical Corps
Maj. and Bt. Lt.-Col. John Arthur Tupman, Gloucestershire Regiment
Lt.-Col. Ralph Edward Tyler, Royal Garrison Artillery
Maj. Reginald Bramley Tyrrell, Royal Army Ordnance Corps
Temp Lt. Sydney Gorton Vanderfelt, Royal Army Service Corps
Lt.-Col. John Vansagnew, Indian Army
Hon Maj. Charles James Vasey
Temp Maj. Gomer Miles Vaughan, Royal Engineers
Lt.-Col. Alfred Vella, Royal Malta Artillery
Capt. Claude Malcolm Hamilton Venour, Hampshire Regiment, attd. Nigeria Regiment
Temp Lt.-Col. William James Nathaniel Vincent  Royal Army Medical Corps
Quartermaster and Capt. Archibald Walker, Royal Engineers
Quartermaster and Maj. John Walker  Yorkshire Regiment
Maj. John Gustavus Russell Walsh, Royal Berkshire Regiment
Capt. Archibald Stephen Walter
Maj. Robert Francis Walters, Labour Corps, attd. Essex Regiment
Temp Maj. George Laird Walton, Royal Engineers
Capt. Granville Walton, Royal Engineers
Lt.-Col. Cecil Wanliss, South Lancashire Regiment, attd. Manchester Regiment
Lt. Oscar Emanuel Warburg, Royal Garrison Artillery
Beatrice Gascoigne Ward  Asst. Commandant, Women's Legion
Temp Maj. John Dudley Ward, Army Pay Department
Quartermaster and Maj. Thomas Ward, Royal Artillery
Lt.-Col. Charles Edward Warde, Kent Volunteer Corps
Temp Maj. David Risk Wardrop, Army Pay Department
Lt.-Col. Charles Edward Warner  Kent Cyclist Battalion
Quartermaster and Maj. John Warrener, Royal Fusiliers
Maj. Bertram Arthur Warry, Essex Regiment
Maj. Robert Sydney Waters, Pathans, Indian Army
Maj. Edward Owen Wathen, Northumberland Fusiliers
Capt. Evelyn Cyril Watson, 7th Dragoon Guards
Capt. George Leybourne Watson, Royal Scots
Temp Maj. James Robert Watson, Army Pay Department
Maj. Humphrey Watts, Cheshire Regiment
Capt. G. R. H. Webb, Royal Engineers
Temp Capt. John Montague Webb, 2nd King Edward's Horse
Maj. Philip Webb, Royal Army Ordnance Corps
Temp Lt.-Col. Ralph Gotland Webber
Capt. Sir Augustus Frederick Walpole Edward Webster  Grenadier Guards
Temp Capt. Charles Kingsley Webster
Temp Capt. Henry Holman Weekes, Royal Army Medical Corps
Maj. Arthur Francis Percival Wehner, Royal Garrison Artillery
Maj. Cecil George Wellesley, East Yorkshire Regiment
Maj. Harvey Welman, Indian Army
Maj. David Thomson Welsh, York and Lancaster Regiment
Temp Capt. Charles James West  Royal Army Medical Corps
Lt.-Col. Richard Melbourne West  Royal Army Medical Corps
Lt. Frederick Newell Westbury 
Temp Lt.-Col. George Westcott, Scottish Rifles
Maj. Reginald Salter Weston  Manchester Regiment
Maj. William Edward May Wetherell, Bedfordshire Regiment
Temp Capt. Charles Wheeler, Royal Army Service Corps
Maj. George Greenhough Whiffin, Royal West Surrey Regiment
Capt. and Bt. Maj. Arthur Marmaduke Whitaker, Yorkshire Regiment
Hon Lt.-Col. Ernest William White  Royal Army Medical Corps
Temp Maj. The Hon Francis William White
Temp Capt. John Christian White  
Maj. Robert Fortescue Moresby White  Leicestershire Regiment
Lt. The Hon Ronald George Whiteley, Royal Garrison Artillery
Maj. Robert Langton Digby Whitfield, Royal Army Ordnance Corps
Maj. Carl Wiggins, Royal Army Ordnance Corps
Lt.-Col. George Alfred Wigley  Nottinghamshire and Derbyshire Regiment
Capt. Arthur Roland George Wilberforce, Royal Sussex Regiment
Capt. Thomas Paul Wiley, Royal Engineers
Maj. and Hon Lt.-Col. Stephen Willcock, Manchester Regiment
Maj. Edmund Ernest Wilford  Indian Army
Capt. Arthur Frederick Basil Williams
Temp Lt. Alfred Harry Williams, Royal Army Service Corps
Hon Temp Capt. Albert Howard Williams
Temp Capt. Ernest Ulysses Williams, Royal Army Medical Corps
Temp Lt. Harold Williams, Royal Engineers
Temp Maj. Stanley Walter Williams, Royal Army Medical Corps
Capt. Vivian Dunbar Stanley Williams, 5th Dragoon Guards
Maj. Frederick Willoughby  1st Volunteer Battalion, Northamptonshire Regiment
Capt. Charles Spencer Wilson, Suffolk Regiment
Maj. and Bt. Lt.-Col. Godfrey Harold Alfred Wilson 
Lt.-Col. Henry Christopher Bruce Wilson, York and Lancaster Regiment
Temp Capt. James Robert Menzies Wilson, Royal Engineers
Temp Capt. William Perceval Wilson
Maj. Douglas George Nugent Irving Wimberley, Army Pay Department
Capt. John Windham-Wright, Royal West Surrey Regiment
Rev. Douglas Percy Winnifrith, Royal Army Chaplains' Department
Bt. Col. William Robert Winter, Royal Army Service Corps
Temp Lt. Kenneth A. Wolfe-Barry
Capt. Norman Frederic Woodroffe, London Regiment
Temp Maj. James Cowan Woods  Royal Army Medical Corps
Temp Capt. and Bt. Maj. Rickard John Woods
Temp Maj. Sydney Winslow Woollett, Royal Army Medical Corps
Temp Capt. Charles Earnshaw Woosnam, Royal Army Service Corps
Maj. Reginald Worth  Royal Army Medical Corps
Temp Capt. Ernest Dixon Wortley, Royal Army Medical Corps
Temp Lt.-Col. William Wrangham  Royal Army Medical Corps
Maj. Maurice Beresford Wright  Royal Army Medical Corps
Quartermaster and Maj. Stephen Wright  Coldstream Guards
Lt.-Col. John Railton Wyatt  Dorsetshire Regiment
Temp Maj. Charles Frederick Talbot Wyndhant Quin, Glam. Yeomanry
Capt. Edward George Wynyard  labour Corps 
Maj. Richard Darner Wynyard, East Surrey Regiment
Temp Maj.-Walter Perceval Yetts, Royal Army Medical Corps
Lt.-Col. William Alfred Youden  Norfolk Regiment
Maj. Richard Ashmur Blair Young, Army Pay Department
Lt.-Col. John Henderson Younger, Argyll and Sutherland Highlanders
Lt.-Col. John Robert Yourdi  Royal Army Medical Corps

Canadian Forces
Maj. David Lionel MacKenzie Baxter, Canadian Army Service Corps
Lt.-Col. William Joseph Bentley  Canadian Army Dental Corps
Lt.-Col. Claude Brown, Canadian Army Dental Corps
Maj. Stanley Gordon Chown, Canadian Army Medical Corps
Lt.-Col. Ernest Stanley Clifford  Canadian 
Lt.-Col. Cole Edward Cooper Cole, Canadian Army Medical Corps
Capt. Edward Charles Complin, Ocean and Rail. Transport Department
Capt. Robert Cecil Cowan, Canadian Forestry Corps
Maj. Frederick Davy, Canadian Army Pay Corps
Lt.-Col. Henry Charles Schomberg Elliot, Canadian Army Medical Corps
Maj. James Pemberton Fell, Canadian Engineers
Lt.-Col. Orland Kingsley Gibson  Canadian Dental Sec
Maj. William Herbert Hewgill, Alberta Regiment
Maj. Samuel John Huggins, 2nd Ontario Regiment
Capt. William Clarence Inglis  Canadian Army Pay Corps
Capt. John Logan Kappele, Canadian Army Dental Corps
Maj. Thomas Reginald Ker, Quebec Regiment
Rev John Knox, Canadian Army Chaplain Services
Temp Lt.-Col. Owen Rickell Lobley  Canadian Army Pay Department
Maj. Carson Alexander Vivian McCormack, Central Ontario Regiment
Temp Capt. Gordon Leslie MacGillivray, Quebec Regiment
Maj. Carlyle William Maclnnis, Alberta Regiment
Lt.-Col. Daniel Sayre MacKay, Saskatchewan Regiment
Maj. Thomas Roderick MacKenzie, Quebec Regiment
Maj. Sir Andrew MacPhail, Canadian Army Medical Corps
Lt.-Col. Charles Duncan McPherson, Saskatchewan Regiment
Lt.-Col. Edward George Mason, Canadian Army Medical Corps
Temp Lt.-Col. William Harcourt Milne, Canadian Forestry Corps
Temp Capt. Kelson Charles Harley Monks, Canadian Engineers
Maj. Charles Andrews Moorhead, Eastern Ontario Regiment
Lt.-Col. William Harry Muirhead, Nova Scotia Regiment
Maj. Arthur Egbert Myatt, Western Ontario Regiment
Maj. Bayard Lamont Neiley, Canadian Army Dental Corps
Quartermaster and Hon Capt. William James Nicholson, Canadian Machine Gun Corps
Lt. John Wintour Robson, British Columbia Regiment
Temp Maj. Frederick Charles Rush  New Brunswick Regiment
Capt. John Percival Spanton, Canadian Forces
Lt. Fred Spencer, Saskatchewan Regiment
Temp Maj. Daniel Ernes Sprague, Canadian Forestry Corps
Temp Maj. Albert Newton Stirrett  Canadian Army Service Corps
Temp Capt. Simon Marshall Tate, Western Ontario Regiment
Temp Maj. Robert Broad well Thompson  Canadian Army Pay Corps
Temp Capt. John James Thomson, Canadian Army Medical Corps
Hon Maj. Sydney Jonathan Tinner
Temp Maj. Thomas McTineaux Walker, Canadian Forestry Corps
Rev David Victor Warner, Canadian Army Chaplain Services
Maj. Edward Colpitts Weyman, Quebec Regiment
Capt. Stanley Wharton, British Columbia Regiment
Lt.-Col. David Alexander Whitton, Canadian Army Medical Corps
Rev Thomas Augustine Wilson, Canadian Army Chaplain Services
Lt.-Col. Robert Elmer Wodehouse, Canadian Army Medical Corps
Lt. Mark Arthur Wolff, Manitoba Regiment

Australian Imperial Forces
Capt. Hugh Gerner Brain  
Maj. Alexander Cook, Royal Army Medical Corps
Hon Maj. Francis Leopold Crane
Lt.-Col. Charles Edgar Dennis, Australian Army Medical Corps
Maj. Norman Maxwell Gibson, Australian Army Medical Corps
Maj. Reginald Mack Gowing, Australian Army Ordnance Corps
Lt.-Col. Cyril Tracy Griffiths  
Lt.-Col. George Justice Hogben  
Maj. Stanley Borwood Holder, Australian Army Pay Corps
Maj. Charles Holmes Howard
Lt.-Col. Alfred Jackson
Maj. Lewis Wilmer Jeffrie  Australian Army Medical Corps
Lt.-Col. Glen Alburn William James Knight, Australian Army Medical Corps
Maj. John Macdonald, Australian Army Medical Corps
Capt. William Henry Marshall, A.A.D.S
Rev Frederick James Miles  Australian Army Chaplains' Department
Lt.-Col. Alfred Moon  Australian Army Service Corps
Maj. Frederick William Page, Australian Army Ordnance Corps
Maj. Elliott Frank Playford, Australian Infantry
Lt.-Col. Hugh Corbett Taylor-Young, Australian Army Medical Corps
Maj. John Linton Treloar  
Maj. Charles Percival Wilson, Australian Army Pay Corps
Capt. Latham August Withall, Australian Engineers

New Zealand Forces
Maj. Leopold George Dyke Acland  NZ Army Service Corps
Lt.-Col. Phillip Oywalk Andrew, NZ Medical Corps
Maj. Charles Eric Andrews, NZ Staff Corps
Maj. Cyril Victor Baigent  NZ Medical Corps
Maj. George Bertram Banks, NZ Staff Corps
Lt.-Col. George Barclay  NZ Engineers
Lt.-Col. Henry Ferdinand Bernau, NZ Medical Corps
Maj. Frederick Thompson Bowerbank  NZ Medical Corps
Maj. Edumand Harry Colbeck  NZ Medical Corps
Capt. David Eardley Fenwick  NZ Medical Corps
Maj. George Ernest Oswald Fenwick  NZ Medical Corps
Capt. Reginald Ronald Gow, Otago Regiment
Lt.-Col. Alexander Wilson Hogg, NZ Medical Corps
Capt. Gordon Hovey, Auckland Mounted Rifles
Maj. Arnold Woodford Izard  NZ Medical Corps
Rev Archdeacon John Attwood Jacob, NZ Chaplains' Department
Maj. William Kay, NZ Rifle Brigade
Maj. Thomas Lawless, NZ Army Pay Corps
Maj. Norman James Levien  NZ Army Ordnance Corps
Lt.-Col. William Little, NZ Medical Corps
Maj. Thomas McChristell, NZ Army Ordnance Corps
Maj. Eric Lachlan Marchant, NZ Medical Corps
Maj. John Mounsey, NZ Forces
Maj. Neville Newcomb, NZ Forces
Maj. Francis Edward Ostler, NZ Army Service Corps
Maj. Henry Peacock, NZ Staff Corps
Maj. Henry Percy Pickerill  NZ Medical Corps
Maj. William Henry Turnbuli, NZ Army Service Corps
Maj. Francis Parnell Tymons, N.Z.D.C
Capt. Herbert Horatio Spencer Westmacott, Auckland Regiment

South African Forces
Temp Maj. William James Averre, SA Army Service Corps
Maj. Harry Cecil Baker, SA Army Medical Corps
Temp Maj. Harry Hyndman Balfour  SA Army Medical Corps
Capt. Leonard Sydney Dacomb, British SA Police
Temp Maj. Henry Douglas Daniels, SA Army Service Corps
Maj. Robert Deane  SA Infantry
Capt. John William George Fincham, Active Citizen Force
Capt. Edward Thornton Fox, British SA Police
Temp Lt.-Col. David Horwich, SA Army Medical Corps
Capt. Richard Charles Lange, Active Citizen Force
Temp Lt.-Col. Raymond Maxwell, SA Medical Corps
Capt. Donald Menzies, SA Army Service Corps
Maj. Francis Napier, SA Army Medical Corps
Temp Lt.-Col. Herbert John Orford, SA Army Medical Corps
Capt. Robert Derwent Parker, SA Army Medical Corps
Maj. Arthur Llewellyn Pepper  SA Reserve Brigade
Capt. William James Phillips, British SA Police
Temp Lt.-Col. Charles Porter, SA Army Medical Corps
Maj. Alfred Edward Rann  SA Heavy Artillery
Maj. James Charles Alexander Rigby  SA Army Medical Corps
Temp Maj. Alfred James Selick, Active Citizen Force
Maj. Charles George Trevett, SA Army Service Corps
Capt. Martinus Johannes Wolmarans, Permanent Force (Staff)

Newfoundland Forces
Lt. George Michael Emerson, Royal Newfoundland Regiment
Capt. William Howe Greene, Royal Newfoundland Regiment
Maj. James St. Pierre Knight, Royal Newfoundland Regiment
Maj. Liamont Patterson  Royal Newfoundland Regiment
Maj. Henry A. Timewell, Overseas Forces, Royal Newfoundland Regiment
Lt. Gerald Joseph Whitty  Royal Newfoundland Regiment

Civil Division

British India

Khan Bahadur Kazi Aziz-ud-Din Ahmad  Judicial Secretary, Dholpur State, Rajputana
Maulvi Nizam-ud-Din Ahmad, Nawab Nizamat Jang Bahadur, Political Secretary to His Exalted Highness the Nizams Government, Hyderabad, (Deccan)
Wilfrid Alder, Indian Civil Service, Accountant-General and Commissioner of Issue of Paper Currency, Cawnpore, United Provinces
Arthur Campbell Armstrong, District Superintendent of Police, Buldana, Berar, Central Provinces
Satish Chandra Banerji, Deputy Superintendent of Police on Staff of Director, Central Intelligence, Bengal
Albert Alfred Barnard, Inspector of Munitions, Pare, Bombay
Sybil Barton, Joint Honorary Secretary, St. John Ambulance Association, Bangalore, Mysore State
Lt.-Col., Edward Charles Bayley  Indian Army, Private Secretary to the Lieutenant-Governor of the Punjab
Evelyn Mary Bell, Red Cross Bureau, Simla, Punjab
Edward Henry Berthpud, India Civil Service Deputy Commissioner, Hazaribagh, Bihar and Orissa
Lt.-Col. Sambhaji Rap Bhonsle, Commanding 3rd Gwalior Lancers
Edward Arthur Henry Blunt, Indian Civil-Service, Director of Civil Supplies, Cawnpore, United Provinces
Charles William Charteris Carson, Accountant-General, Bombay
Frederick Francis Ralph Channer, Deputy Conservator of Forests, United Provinces
Maj. John Clayton Coldstream, Indian Army, Secretary, Central Employment and Labour Bureau
Henry Moore Annesley Cooke, Mysore State
May Cross-Barratt, President, Silver Wedding Fund-Branch, Bangalore, Mysore State
Maj. Charles Gilbert Crosthwaite, Indian Army, Deputy Commissioner, Bannu, North-West Frontier Province
Edgar George Dixon, Secretary, Messrs. Turner, Morrison and Co., Calcutta, Bengal
Duncan Donald, Superintendent of Police, Punjab
Houston Duncan, Superintendent of Transportation, Bengal-Nagpur Railway Company, Bengal
Ethel Duval, National Indian War Work Association, Bengal
Thomas Peter Ellis, Indian Civil Service, Legal Remembrancer to the Government of the Punjab
Cecil Henry Elmesy  Officiating Health Officer, Port of Calcutta, Bengal
Lewis Leigh Fermor  Superintendent, Geological Survey of India
May Fowler, Vice-President of the Sind Women's Branch, of the Imperial War Relief Fund, Bombay
John Hugh Ronald Fraser, Indian Civil Service, Deputy Commissioner, Hazara, North-West Frontier Province
Maj. William Best Greig, Indian Army (retired), Divisional Recruiting Officer, Delhi
Francis Charles Griffith, Acting Commissioner of Police, Bombay
The Reverend Canon Edward Guilford, Church Missionary Society, President of the Tarn Taran Municipality, Amritear District, Punjab
Ashoke Chandra Gupta, Deputy Controller of War Accounts
Seth Bandeali Hajibhoy, Burhanpur, Nimar District, Central Provinces
Maj. Clayton Alexander Francis Kingston, Indian Medical Service, Personal Assistant to the Surgeon-General with the Government of Madras
Kate Evans, Lady Hudson, Ladies Work Party, Simla-Delhi
Charles Innes, Public Works Department, Executive Engineer, Tavoy Division, Burma
Samuel Jackson, Superintending Chemist, Buckingham and Carnatic Mills, Madras
Rai Bahadur Onkar Mull Jatia, Calcutta, Bengal
Mary Eliot Johnson, Red Cross Association, Bangalore, Mysore State
Dr. James Glansey Johnstone, Lingah, Persian Gulf
Naw-ati Abdul Rahim Khan, Chief of Pathari Central India
Khan i Bahadur Mir Ghulam Mahomed Khan of Talpui, Sind, Bombay
Sahibzada Muhammad Jafar Ali Khan, of Maler Kotla, Punjab
Rai Bahadur Seth Sufli Lai Karnani of Sirsa, Punjab
Capt. Guy Talbot Lemon, Indian Army Reserve of Officers, Deputy Assistant Direct, General of Military Works, Army Headquarters
Samuel Lupton, Editor, The Daily Gazette, Karachi, Sind, Bombay
Charles Michael Lyons, Burma 
James Wallace Macfarlane, Deputy Controller (Hides), Bombay
Maj. Duncan Iver Macpherson, Indian Army, Commandant, Military Police Battalion, Bengal
Samuel Fitzgerald Madden, Vice-Principal, Mayo College, Ajmer, Rajputana
Lady Chihubhai Madhavlal, widow of Sir Chinubhai Madhavlal, Baronet, of Ahmedabad, Bombay
Maude Maude, Red Cross Association, Bihjar and Orissa
Maj. William Charles Waimer Miller, Indian Army Reserve of Officers, Public Works Department, late Assistant Recruiting Officer, Shahpur, Punjab
Rao Bahadur Seth Goverdhandas Motilal Mohatta, Sind, Bombay
Hilda Mary Moncrieff Smith, Indian Comforts for the Troops Fund, Simla and Delhi
Adam Wilson Moodie, Deputy Conservator of Forests Katha Division, Burma
Violet Murray, Honorary Superintendent of the Burma Red Cross Depot
Charles Stanley Garland Mylrea, American Mission, Koweit, Persian Gulf
Herbert Edgar Whitehead O'Brian, Field Disbursing Officer (British Troops), Office of the Field Controller of Military Accounts, Poona
Lt.-Col. Eugene John O'Meara, Indian Medical Service, Principal, Medical School, Agra, United Provinces
Ernest Oughton, Baluchistan Chrome Company, Baluchistan
Rai Sahib Mathura Pershad, Proprietor, The Central Provinces War News, Chhindwara, Central Provinces
William Wallace Powell, Indian Civil Service, Assistant Commissioner, Pind Dad an Khan, Punjab
Kunwar Jagdish Prasad, Indian Civil Service, Magistrate and Collector, Shahjahanpur, United Provinces
Lt.-Col. Abdul Qayum, Khan Bahadur, Commanding Bhopal Victoria Lancers, Bhopal
Alexander Murray Reith, Deputy Secretary, War Purposes Board, Bombay
Frances Maud, Lady Richards, Red Cross and Comforts for the Troops Associations, Allahabad, United Provinces
George Alexander Richardson, Assistant Resident, Aden
Alice Richmond, Red Cross Association, Madras
Lt.-Col. Montgomery Browne Roberts (Indian Army, retired), 39th Garhwal Rifles, United Provinces 
Stuart Duncan Robertson, District Traffic Superintendent, Operative, Great Indian Peninsula Railway, Bombay
Rai Bahadur Ram Sarup, of Pilibhit, United Provinces
Sardar Bahadur Bhai Arjan Singh, of Bagrian, Ludhiana District, Punjab
Diwan Chet Singh, Honorary Magistrate of Paxna in the Agra District, United Provinces
Rai Bahadur Thakur Dhonkal Singh, of Gorao, Jodhpur State, Rajputana
Capt. Sardar Gopal Singh, Member of the Legislative Council of the Punjab
Kanwar Raghbir Singh, Provincial Civil Service, Extra Assistant Commissioner, Moga, Punjab
Raja Raghuraj Singh, of Mankapur, United Provinces
Lt.-Col. Ram Singh, Commanding Navanagar Lancers
The Honourable Christina Philippa Agnes Spence, Ladies Work Party Simla, Delhi
Capt. Leonard Cording Stevens, Royal Field Artillery Central Publicity aboard, India 
Norman Cecil Stiffe, Indian Civil Service, Magistrate and Collector, Cawnpore, United Provinces
George Frederick Stoddart, late Manager, New Glencoe Tea Estate, Jalpaiguri, Bengal
William Fitzroy Scudamore Stallard Symes, Electrical Engineer, Delhi, Punjab
Ernest William Tomkins, Superintendent of Police, Peshawar, North-West Frontier Province
Hugh Kennedy Trevaskis, Indian Civil Service, Assistant Commissioner, Ambala, Punjab
Thomas Aubrey Voice, Superintendent, Public Debt Office, Calcutta
Walter Granville Warburton, Deputy Coal Controller, Bombay
Lt. William Robert Ward, Commandant, Sarhad Levy Corps, Baluchistan
Andrew Williamson, Madras and Southern Mahratta Railway, Chief Recruiting Officer
Maj. Lennard Francis George Stovin Wylde, Indian Army, Controller of Military Accounts, 3rd (Lahore) Division

Dominion of New Zealand
Thomas Noel Brodrick, for services as Under-Secretary of the New Zealand Lands and Survey Department
Frederick James Burgess, Stipendiary Magistrate, for services as a Member of a Military Service Board
James Burnett 
Donald George Clark, for services as Commissioner of the Land and Income Tax Department
The Right Reverend Henry William Cleary  Roman Catholic Bishop of Oxford, for services as Chaplain to the New Zealand Expeditionary Force
Daniel George Arthur Cooper, Stipendiary Magistrate, for services as a Member of a Military Service Board
Victor Grace Day, Stipendiary Magistrate for services as a Member of a Military Service Board
 Frederick Earl, Stipendiary Magistrate, for services as a Member of a Military Service Board
James Sim Evans, Stipendiary Magistrate, for services in connection with a Military Service Board
George Cox Fache, Commissioner of Pensions, for services in connection with War Pensions
Frederick Chandos Courtenay Fell, for services in connection with patriotic organisations
James Findlay, for services as Chairman of the Overseas Shipowners' Committee, Wellington
Malcolm Fraser, for services as Government Statistician
James Hislop, for services as Under-Secretary of the Department of Internal Affairs, the Department in charge of War Funds
William Barr Montgomery, for services as Comptroller of Customs
Thomas Moss, for services as a Member of the National Efficiency Board
Vera Anita Myers, for services as Head of the Voluntary Staff at the Base Records Office, New Zealand
John William Poynton, Stipendiary Magistrate, for services in connection with a Military Service Board
George Edward Rhodes, for services in connection with the New Zealand Branch of the British Red Cross Society and Order of St. John of Jerusalem
Thomas Sheriff Ronaldson, Assistant Public Trustee, for service as Chairman of the Financial Assistance Board
The Reverend William Shirer, Senior Presbyterian Chaplain to the New Zealand Military Forces
Guy Hardy Scholefield 
George Shirtcliffe, for services in connection with the New Zealand Branch of the British Red Cross Society and Order of St. John of Jerusalem
The Right Reverend Thomas Henry Sprott  Anglican Bishop of Wellington, for services in connection with the selection and allocation of Chaplains to the New Zealand Expeditionary Force
King Topia, High Chief of the Wanganui and Tuwharotoa Tribes, for services in connection with recruiting and in securing land for returned Māori soldiers
Thomas Wilson, for services in connection with the Financial Assistance Board

Union of South Africa
Deputy Commissioner George Stephen Beer, South African Police
George Ernest Birch, Chief Clerk, Governor-General's Office
Paul Dudley Bray, Collector of Customs, Durban
Paul Dietrich Cluver  Mayor of Stellenbosch
Herbert Sutton Cooke, for services in connection with the recruiting of the South African Native Labour Corps
Jean Crichton Cullen, Honorary Secretary, Red Cross Sub-Committee of the South African Hospital and Comforts Fund
Richard Court Dent, Chairman of the Wool Advisory Committee, East London
Eveline Mary Duquemin  Vice-Chairrnan of the Johannesburg Local Committee of the Governor-General's Fund
William Francis Earle, Chairman of the Wool Advisory Committee, Durban
John Fairbairn  Honorary Secretary, Red Cross of South Africa
Bertha Helen Frood, Chairman of the Personal Service Committee of the South African Hospital and Comforts Fund
Deputy Commissioner Richard Shearman Godley, South African Police
Deputy Commissioner George Douglas Gray, South African Police
Mary Augusta Mathers, for services at South African Work Rooms in London
Charles Cecil Miller, Collector of Customs, Cape Town
Lieutenant-Colonel Charles Frederick Kennan Murray  for services as District Brigade Surgeon, St. John's Ambulance, Cape Town
Major Thomas Leslie O'Reilly, Military Magistrate of Omarura, South West Protectorate
Professor John Orr, for services to the Johannesburg Disabled Soldiers Board
Willie Rockey, Member of the House of Assembly, for services to the Johannesburg Disabled Soldiers Board
Frederick Rowland  Honorary Secretary, Red Cross, Johannesburg
Emma Jane Searle  for Red Cross work
Lewis Serecold Skeels, Deputy Controller of Imports and Exports
James Sommerville, for services in connection with the settlement of returned soldiers
Percy Henry Taylor  ex-Mayor of Pietermatitzburg
Leo Weinthal, Chairman and Honorary Organiser of the " African World" War Comforts Service
Charles Winser  Honorary Secretary, Red Cross, Durban
Deputy Commissioner Thomas Joseph Wynne, South African Police

Newfoundland
Charles Henry Hutchings  Inspector-General of Constabulary
Francis Joseph Morris  for services as Chairman of the Recruiting Committee
Rachael Fannie Parsons, for services on behalf of the Women's Patriotic Association
Ann Roper, for services on behalf of the Women's Patriotic Association
Robert Thomas Squarey, for services in connection with recruiting and the care of returning parties of soldiers
Patrick Joseph Summers  Deputy Minister of Justice, Secretary of the Military Service Board

Crown Colonies, Protectorates, Etc.
Constance Angel, Lady Allardyce, for services in connection with War Charities in the Bahama Islands
Francesco Azzopardi, Unofficial Member of the Executive Council and President of the Wheat Board, Malta
Major Charles James Bagenal, Political Officer, Tabora, German East Africa
Major Denis Lynch Baines, Political Officer, Bukoba, German East Africa
William Chamberlain, Assistant Secretary, Royal Colonial Institute
Philip Ward Cooper, Provincial Commissioner, Uganda, for services in recruiting and organisation of carriers
John Rowland Crook, Government Engineer, and Chief Assistant Cable Censor, Gibraltar
Eu Tong Sen, Unofficial Member of the Federal Council, Federated Malay States
Francis Goodwin Gosling, Assistant Colonial Secretary, Bermuda, for services in connection with Red Cross and other war funds
Izy Constance, Lady Haddon-Smith, for services in connection with Red Cross and other war charities, Windward Islands
Charles Henry Harper, Chief Assistant Colonial Secretary, Gold Coast 
Sydney ThMwall Harrison  Comptroller of Customs, Barbados, for services as Reporting Officer
Edward Vincent Hemmant, District Commissioner, East Africa Protectorate, for general administrative services and the supply of recruits and carriers
Herbert Keys Hillyer, Secretary Colombo Port Commission, for services in connection with, war charities
Joseph Howard, for general war services in Malta
Malcolm Ludlow Jones, Chief Clerk, Oversea Settlement Office
William Gemmell Kay, Unofficial Member of the Legislative Council, Trinidad, for services to the Priority Authority and other war work
Godfrey James King, Civil Commissioner, Salisbury, Rhodesia, for services as Censor
James Lochhead Surgeon, Colonial Hospital, Gibraltar
James Challenor Lynch, Member of the Legislative Council, and Member of the Recruiting Committee, Barbados
Celia Macdonald of the Isles, for services to the Overseas Forces
Ranald McDonald, Comptroller of Customs, Nyasaland Protectorate
Commander Duncan Charles Macintyre,  Harbour Master, Penang, Straits Settlements
Hugh McLelland, Unofficial Member of the Legislative Council, Trinidad, and Mayor of San Fernando
Arthur William Mahaffy, Administrator of Dominica
Edward Gilbert Morris, District Commissioner, Uganda Protectorate, for services in organising levies, carriers, and supplies
Alfredo Parnis  one of His Majesty's Judges for the Island of Malta
Elizabeth Miller Phillips, for services as Honorary Secretary, Trinidad and Tobago Branch of the Red Cross Fund
Ratu Joni Antonio Rabici, Native Member of the Legislative Council and Roko of Cakaudrove Province, Fiji
Lieutenant-Colonel Charles Edward Daliel Oldham Rew, Officer Commanding the British Forces and Senior Political Officer, Togoland
Captain Stanley Rivers-Smith, Director of Education, Zanzibar Protectorate, for services in recruiting and organisation of carriers
John Argyll Robertson, Manager of the Chartered Bank, Kuala Lumpur, for services in connection with finance and war charities, Malay States
Thomas Roy, General Manager of the Shire Highlands Railway
The Reverend Alfred Barrett Sackett, Temporary Chaplain to the Forces, for services in connection with the "Welcome Home," Gibraltar
Frederick Emelius Scott, Mayor of Port of Spain, Trinidad, for services in connection with recruiting and other war work
Paymaster-Commander Alan Edward Stack  Assistant Secretary to the Administration, German East Africa
Robert Walter Taylor, Treasurer, Somaliland Protectorate, for services as Chief Cable Censor and in connection with recruiting
Thomas Shenton Whitelegge Thomas, Assistant Chief Secretary, Uganda, for Avar services in the East Africa Protectorate
Major Osmund Tpnks, Commanding Ceylon Supply and Transport Section, for services to troops passing through Ceylon
Antonio Cassar Torreggiani  Officer-in Charge of the Flour Control, Malta
The Honourable Dorothy Marguerite Elizabeth Trefusis, for work in connection with war charities and recruiting in Jamaica
Eubule John Waddington, Assistant 
District Commissioner, East Africa Protectorate, for services in recruiting askaris and carriers
The Right Reverend John Jamieson Willis  Bishop of Uganda, for valuable assistance throughout the period of hostilities

Honorary Officers
Sheikh Abubakari bin Ali, Liwali of Vanga
Sheikh Ahmed bin Sud, Acting Liwali of Lamu

See also
1919 Birthday Honours - Full list of awards.

References

Birthday Honours
1919 awards
1919 in Australia
1919 in Canada
1919 in India
1919 in New Zealand
1919 in the United Kingdom